= List of Pickands Mather ships =

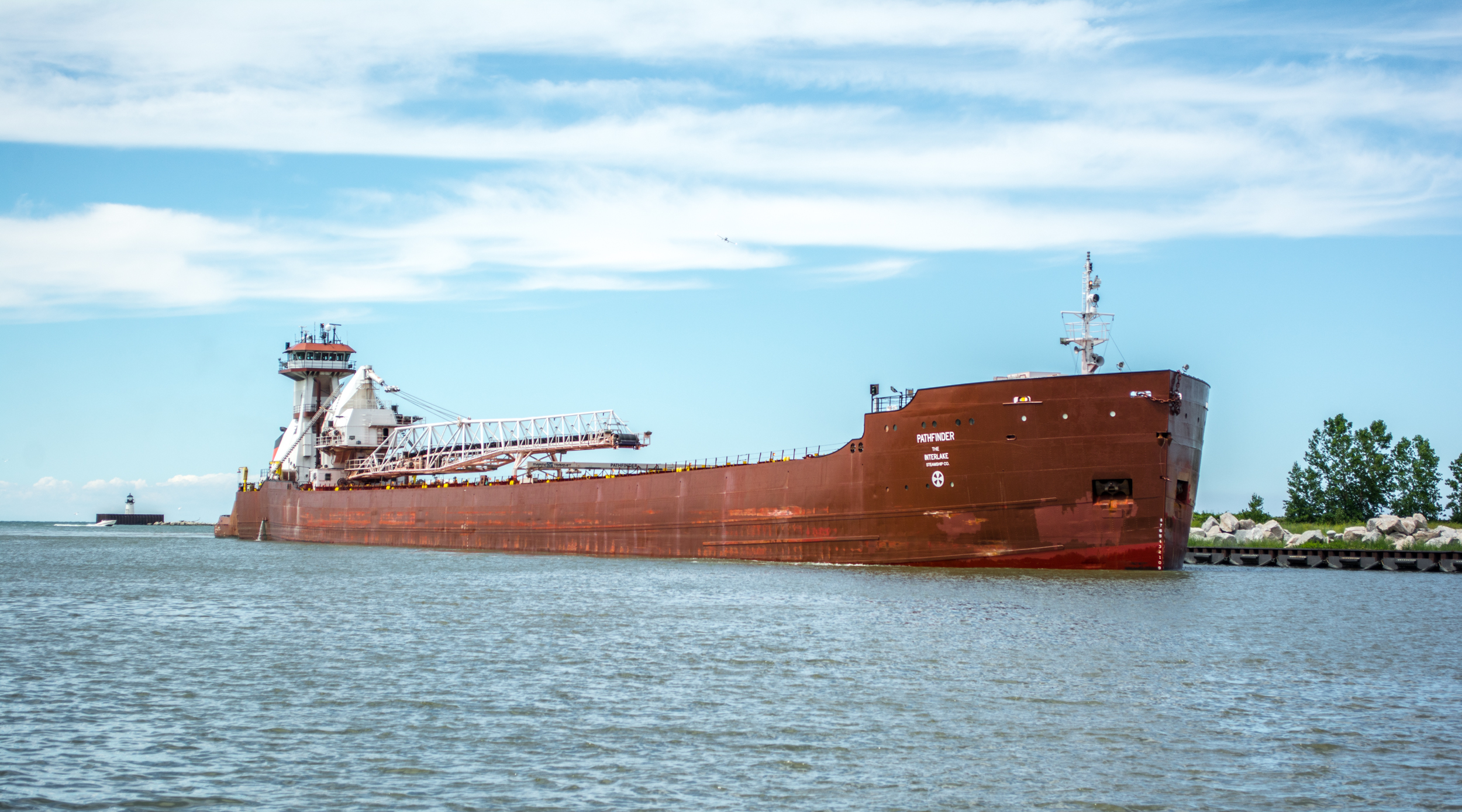
Dorothy Ann-Pathfinder Tug-Barge, entering the Port of Cleveland in June 2017. The Pathfinder was built in 1952 as the SS J. L. Mauthe for Pickands Mather's subsidiary, the Interlake Steamship Co.

The list of ships owned and operated by Pickands Mather consists of barges and freighters operating on the Great Lakes in the United States and Canada. Vessels include those owned by the Marine Department of Pickands Mather & Company from the company's founding in 1883 until its sale to Diamond Shamrock Corporation in 1968; those owned by Diamond Shamrock Corporation until the sale of the subsidiary to Moore-McCormack Resources in 1973; those owned by Moore-McCormack Resources until the sale of the Pickands Mather subsidiary to Cleveland-Cliffs Inc. in 1986; and those owned by Cleveland-Cliffs until the spinoff of the Interlake Steamship Company subsidiary in 1987.

The list includes vessels owned personally by the owners of Pickands Mather (Note: Until the early 1900s, it was common for a single individual or group of individuals to own a Great Lakes cargo ship. But after 1900, ownership passed almost exclusively to corporations.) and directly by Pickands Mather, as well as those owned by its subsidiaries. These include some vessels owned by the Interlake Steamship Company. This company was a subsidiary of Pickands Mather from the subsidiary's founding in 1894 until its spinning off as an independent corporation in 1987. It does not include vessels operated by Interlake Steamship since 1987. It also does not include vessels operated by other companies prior to their merger with Interlake, but does include those brought to the merger with Interlake and thereafter operated by Interlake.

== Freighters ==
| Name | Class and type | Owner | In service | Out of service | Fate |
|---|---|---|---|---|---|
| Cetus | Steel-hulled bulk freight steamship | Interlake Steamship Company | 1903; (Note: The vessel was built in 1903. It was originally named the "Henry S. Sill", and owned by J.C. Gilchrist. She was purchased by Interlake Steamship Co. the same year and renamed Cetus.) 1927 (Note: Interlake Steamship instituted foreclosure proceedings against Forest City Steamship after the latter company failed to make payments on the vessel.) | 1923; (Note: Cetus was sold to the Forest City Steamship Co. in October 1923 and renamed the Samuel H. Squire.) 1943 | Reconstructed in 1928; traded to the United States Maritime Commission for a new vessel; scrapped 1946. |
| SS Charles M. Beeghly | Conventional dry bulk Lake freighter (Note: She was lengthened by 96 feet (29 m) in 1972, and converted to a self-unloader in 1981.) | Interlake Steamship Company | 1967 (Note: Built in 1959 as Shenango II.) | 1987 | Sold in 1987 as part of the spin off of the Interlake Steamship Company in a management buyout; repowered in 2009; renamed MV Hon. James L. Oberstar in 2011. |
| SS Col. James Schoonmaker | Conventional dry bulk Lake freighter | Interlake Steamship Company | 1969 (Note: The vessel was built in 1911 and owned by the Shenango Furnace Company. She was sold to the Interlake Steamship Company in 1969.) | 1972 (Note: The vessel was sold to Cleveland-Cliffs in 1972.) | Sold to Cleveland-Cliffs and renamed SS Willis B. Boyer; retired from service in 1980; renamed SS Col. James M. Schoonmaker in 2011 and now a ship museum in Toledo, Ohio. |
| Corvus | Steel-hulled bulk freight steamship | Interlake Steamship Company | 1913 (Note: The vessel was built in 1903 as the J. L. Weeks for Gilchrist Transportation Co. She became part of the Interlake fleet when Interlake absorbed Gilchrist in 1913.) | 1943 | Reconstructed in 1925; traded to the United States Maritime Commission for a new vessel; scrapped 1946. |
| Cygnus | Steel-hulled bulk freight steamship | Interlake Steamship Company | 1913 (Note: The vessel was built in 1903 as the J. C. Gilchrist for Gilchrist Transportation Co. She became part of the Interlake fleet when Interlake abosorbed Gilchrist in 1913.) | 1943 | Reconstructed in 1925; traded to the United States Maritime Commission for a new vessel; scrapped 1946. |
| SS Cyprus | Conventional dry bulk Lake freighter | Lackawanna Steamship Company (Note: The Lackawanna Steamship Company was a subsidiary of Pickands Mather which incorporated in 1906. It changed its name to the Interlake Steamship Company in 1913.) | 1907 | 1907 | Foundered October 11, 1907, off Deer Park, Michigan, in Lake Superior. |
| E. A. S. Clarke | Conventional dry bulk Lake freighter | Interlake Steamship Company | 1916 (Note: The vessel was built in 1907 for the Standard Steamship Co., one of the "Wolvin fleets". Standard Steamship was one of eight firms which merged to form Interlake Steamship in 1913. The Bope was renamed E.A.S. Clarke in April 1916.) | 1970 | Formerly the Interlake vessel H.P. Bope; renamed E.A.S. Clarke in 1916; sold in 1970 to Kinsman Marine Transit Co. and renamed Kinsman Voyager; sold for scrap in 1975 and towed to Hamburg, Germany; used as storage barge and scrapped in Spain in 1978. |
| E. G. Grace | Conventional dry bulk Lake freighter | Interlake Steamship Company | 1943 (Note: The vessel was built by the U.S. Maritime Commission, and intended to be traded to Bethlehem Steel in exchange for obsolete ships. Interlake purchased the vessel instead.) | 1976 | Retired in 1976; scrapped in 1984. |
| SS Elton Hoyt 2nd (1906) (Note: Not to be confused with the Elton Hoyt 2nd built in 1952.) | Conventional dry bulk Lake freighter | Interlake Steamship Company | 1930 (Note: Built in 1906 for the Shenango Furnace Co. as the William P. Snyder. Sold to Stewart Furnace Co. in June 1926 and renamed Elton Hoyt 2nd, then sold again in September 1929 to Youngstown Steamship Co. In both cases, ship was managed by Pickands Mather. Interlake Steamship purchased the vessel in 1930.) | 1966 | Renamed Alex D. Chisholm in 1952; sold to Medusa Portland Cement in 1966 and renamed Medusa Challenger in 1967; went through several ownership and name changes, and now named St. Mary's Challenger as a self-unloading barge paired with tugboat Prentiss Brown owned by St. Mary's Cement Inc. |
| Elton Hoyt 2nd (1952) (Note: Not to be confused with the SS St. Marys Challenger, a vessel built in 1906 and renamed Elton Hoyt 2nd by the Stewart Furnace Co. in June 1926 and the Alex D. Chisholm in 1952.) | Conventional dry bulk Lake freighter | Interlake Steamship Company | 1952 | 1987 | Lengthened by 72 feet (22 m) in 1957; converted to self-unloader in 1980; sold in 1987 as part of the spin off of the Interlake Steamship Company in a management buyout. |
| SS Frank Armstrong | Conventional dry bulk Lake freighter | Interlake Steamship Company | 1943 (Note: The vessel was built by the U.S. Maritime Commission as the SS Pilot Knob. She was renamed SS Frank Armstrong after Interlake took possession of her in May 1943.) | 1976 (Note: Renamed Samuel Mather 1976); see below.) | Converted to oil in 1973; renamed SS Samuel Mather; sold in 1987 as part of the spin off of the Interlake Steamship Company in a management buyout. |
| Frank Purnell (1943; later Steelton) | Flat-deck bulk carrier | Interlake Steamship Company | 1943 (Note: This vessel was built by the United States Maritime Commission and christened McIntyre. She was renamed Frank Purnell before her maiden voyage.) | 1966 | Traded to Bethlehem Steel for the Steelton; renamed Steelton in 1966; sold to Medusa Cement in 1978, and renamed C.T.C. No. 1. (Note: Cleveland-Cliffs briefly chartered it in 1979 and renamed the vessel Pioneer, but the ship was returned to Medusa Cement that year and resumed the C.T.C. No. 1 name.) Depowered in 1982; served as a cement barge until 2009; as of 2020 docked, unused, in Calumet Harbor. |
| Frank Purnell (1943; formerly Steelton) | Flat-deck bulk carrier | Interlake Steamship Company | 1966 (Note: This vessel was built by the United States Maritime Commission in 1943, and christened Pilot Knob. She was renamed Steelton before her maiden voyage. She was traded in 1966 to Interlake Steamship for the Frank Purnell, and converted into a self-unloader.) | 1970 | Sold in 1970 to Oglebay Norton's Columbia Transportation Division and renamed Robert C. Norton; scrapped in 1994. |
| H.P. Bope | Conventional dry bulk Lake freighter | Interlake Steamship Company | 1913 (Note: The vessel was built in 1907 for the Standard Steamship Co., one of the "Wolvin fleets". Standard Steamship was one of eight firms which merged to form Interlake Steamship in 1913.) | 1916 | Renamed E.A.S. Clarke in 1916. |
| Harry Coulby (1927) | Flat-deck bulk carrier | Interlake Steamship Company | 1927 | 1987 | Converted to oil in 1977; sold in 1987 as part of the spin off of the Interlake Steamship Company in a management buyout; sold to Kinsman Lines, Inc. in 1989 and renamed Kinsman Enterprise; scrapped in 2002. |
| SS Herbert C. Jackson | Conventional dry bulk Lake freighter | Interlake Steamship Company | 1959 | 1987 | Sold in 1987 as part of the spin off of the Interlake Steamship Company in a management buyout. |
| Hydrus (1913) | Conventional dry bulk Lake freighter | Interlake Steamship Company | 1913 (Note: The vessel was constructed in 1903 as the R.E. Schuck, and initially owned by Gilchrist Transportation Co. of Cleveland. Gilchrist and six other shipping firms merged with the Interlake Company (a subsidiary of Pickands Mather) in April 1913 to form the Interlake Steamship Company.) | 1913 | Foundered about November 8, 1913, on the Michigan side of Lake Huron during the Great Lakes Storm of 1913. |
| Hydrus (1916) | Conventional dry bulk Lake freighter | Interlake Steamship Company | 1916 (Note: The ship was built in 1899 as the M.A. Hanna for the Cleveland Steamship Co. During the winter of 1915–1916, Interlake Steamship Company purchased the vessel and renamed it the Hydrus.) | 1926 (Note: Interlake sold the Hydrus to Paterson Steamships, Ltd. of Fort William, Ontario, Canada.) | Sold in 1926 to Paterson Steamships, Ltd.; renamed Windoc in 1927; retired and sold for scrap in 1967. |
| SS J. L. Mauthe | Conventional dry bulk Lake freighter | Interlake Steamship Company | 1952 | 1987 | Sold in 1987 as part of the spin off of the Interlake Steamship Company in a management buyout; converted in 1998 to self-unloading barge Pathfinder. |
| MV James R. Barker | Conventional dry bulk Lake freighter | Interlake Steamship Company | 1976 | 1987 (Note: Moore-McCormack spun off the shipping division of Pickands Mather as the Interlake Steamship Company in 1987.) | Sold in 1987 as part of the spin off of the Interlake Steamship Company in a management buyout. |
| SS John Sherwin | Conventional dry bulk Lake freighter | Interlake Steamship Company | 1958 | 1987 | Lengthened in 1972; sold in 1987 as part of the spin off of the Interlake Steamship Company in a management buyout. In long-term lay-up in Detour, Michigan |
| Lagonda | Conventional dry bulk Lake freighter (Note: The ship was reconstructed to carry metal scrap and fitted with a crane in 1926.) | Interlake Steamship Company | 1916 (Note: The ship was built in 1896 for the Cleveland Steamship Co., also known as the "Mitchell Fleet" after the builder of most of its vessels, Captain John Mitchell.) | 1941 | Sold to the American Steamship Company in 1941; scrapped in 1958. |
| MV Mesabi Miner | Conventional dry bulk Lake freighter | Interlake Steamship Company | 1977 | 1987 | Sold in 1987 as part of the spin off of the Interlake Steamship Company in a management buyout. |
| Moses Taylor | Conventional dry bulk Lake freighter | Interlake Steamship Company | 1916 (Note: The ship was built in 1902 for the Cleveland Steamship Co., also known as the "Mitchell Fleet" after the builder of most of its vessels, Captain John Mitchell.) | 1926 | Sold in 1926 to Paterson Steamships Ltd., named changed to Soodoc, scrapped in 1968. |
| Pathfinder | Whaleback steamship | Huron Barge Co. (Note: Pickands Mather incorporated the Huron Barge Company as its subsidiary in December 1891.) | 1892 | 1920 | Sold to Nicholson Universal Steamship Company; converted to flat-deck carrier in 1924, sold for scrap in 1933. |
| Pegasus | Steel-hulled bulk freight steamship | Interlake Steamship Company | 1916 (Note: The vessel was built in 1902 as the William H. Gratwick for John Mitchell, owner of the Mitchell Steamship Company. Interlake Steamship purchased the Mitchell company and all its ships in January 1916. Interlake renamed it the Pegasus.) | 1943 | Reconstructed in 1925; traded to the U.S. Maritime Commission in 1943; scrapped in 1946. |
| Robert R. Rhodes | Wooden bulk steamship | Pickands Mather | 1889 (Note: The ship was built by the Cleveland Dry Dock Co. for a group of investors in 1887. In 1889, Pickands Mather purchased a 1/8th share from these investors.) | 1900 (Note: The vessel was sold to shipping investor John W. Moore of Mentor, Ohio.) | Wrecked October 24, 1921, after striking the upper gates to Lock 3 in the Welland Canal. |
| SS Samuel Mather (1887) | Wooden bulk steamship | Pickands Mather | 1887 (Note: Pickands Mather did not own the ship outright, but had a 1/48th share. Interlake also had a share.) | 1891 | Sank November 21, 1891, in Whitefish Bay, Lake Superior, after colliding with the Brazil. |
| SS Samuel Mather (1892) | Self-propelled whaleback barge built to carry iron ore. | Pickands Mather | 1892 | 1924 | Refitted as self-unloader in 1923–1924; sank September 21–22, 1924, sank off Thunder Bay Island, Michigan, in Lake Huron. |
| SS Samuel Mather (1976) | Conventional dry bulk Lake freighter | Interlake Steamship Company | 1976 (Note: Formerly the Frank Armstrong; see above.) | 1987 | Converted to oil in 1973; sold in 1987 as part of the spin off of the Interlake Steamship Company in a management buyout; sold for scrap in 1988. |
| Saturn | Steel-hulled bulk freight steamship | Interlake Steamship Company | 1916 (Note: The vessel was built in 1901 as the Walter Scranton for John Mitchell, owner of the Etna Steamship Company. Interlake Steamship purchased the Mitchell company and all its ships in January 1916. Interlake renamed it the Pegasus.) | 1943 | Reconstructed in 1913; traded to the U.S. Maritime Commission in 1943; scrapped in 1947. |
| Taurus | Steel-hulled bulk freight steamship | Interlake Steamship Company | 1913 (Note: This vessel was originally built in 1903 for the Gilchrist Transportation Co. She became part of the Interlake fleet when Interlake abosorbed Gilchrist in 1913. Interlake renamed her Taurus.) | 1943 | Reconstructed in 1925; traded to the U.S. Maritime Commission in 1943; scrapped in 1946. |
| V. H. Ketchum | Wooden bulk steamship | Pickands Mather | 1883 (Note: This vessel was built in 1874 for the Toledo & Saginaw Transportation Co. Her construction was funded by a number of investors. Pickands Mather purchased a 13/20th share in the Ketchum in 1883. This was the first ship in the Pickands fleet. Great Lakes ship historian Rodney H. Mills, however, says Pickands Mather did not purchase their shares until 1887. In 1889, Interlake purchased a 63/80th interest in the vessel.) | 1892 (Note: Pickands Mather sold the ship in 1892 to Captain William Mack.) | Sold to other investors; (Note: Mack sold his interest in the ship to Lakewood Transportation Co. in 1896, and Lakewood sold to Seither Transit in 1900.) last owned by Seither Transit Company; burned in 1905 off Ile Parisienne, Whitefish Bay, Lake Superior. |
| Vega | Steel-hulled bulk freight steamship | Interlake Steamship Company | 1916 (Note: The vessel was built in 1905 as the Pendennis White for John Mitchell, owner of the Mitchell Steamship Company. Interlake Steamship purchased the Mitchell company and all its ships in January 1916. Interlake renamed it the Pegasus.) | 1943 | Traded to the U.S. Maritime Commission in 1943; scrapped in 1946. |
| Venus | Conventional dry bulk Lake freighter | Interlake Steamship Company | 1913 (Note: The vessel was built in 1901 for the Globe Steamship Co., which merged with Gilchrist Transportation in 1903. Gilchrist Transportation merged into Interlake Steamship in 1913.) | 1941 | Reconstructed and fitted with cranes in 1927; leased to Boland & Cornelius in 1941; sold to Lake Shore Steel of Chicago in 1958; scrapped in 1961. |
| SS William B. Davock | Conventional dry bulk Lake freighter | Interlake Steamship Company (Note: This subsidiary of Pickands Mather was formed in 1894 as the Interlake Company, and changed its name to Interlake Steamship Company in 1913.) | 1915 (Note: Completed in 1907 for the Vulcan Steamship Co., she was purchased by the Interlake Steamship Company in 1915, and reconstructed in 1922–1923.) | 1940 | Foundered November 11, 1940, off Little Sable Point Light on the Michigan side of Lake Michigan. |
| MV William J. De Lancey | Conventional dry bulk Lake freighter | Interlake Steamship Company | 1981 | 1987 (Note: Moore-McCormack spun off the shipping division of Pickands Mather as the Interlake Steamship Company in 1987.) | Sold in 1987 as part of the spin off of the Interlake Steamship Company in a management buyout; renamed MV Paul R. Tregurtha in 1990. |

== Barges ==
| Name | Class and type | Owner | In service | Out of service | Fate |
|---|---|---|---|---|---|
| Buffalo | Unpowered sailless barge | Pickands Mather | 1898 (Note: Originally built in 1890.) (Note: The first record of Pickands Mather's ownership of the Buffalo is in 1898.) | 1908 (Note: There is a continuous record of ownership by Pickands Mather through 1908. The vessel then no longer appears in registries.) | Retired/scrapped. |
| SS Sagamore (1892) | Whaleback steamship barge | Huron Barge Co. | 1892 | 1901 | Sank 29 July 1901 near Iroquois Point on the Michigan side of Whitefish Bay, Lake Superior, in a collision with the Northern Queen. |
| Sagamore (1904) | Unpowered sailless steel barge | Huron Barge Co. | 1903 (Note: The vessel was built as the David Z. Norton in 1898 for the Wilson Transit Company. It was sold to the Huron Barge Co. in 1903, and renamed Sagamore.) | 1922 (Note: Huron Barge Co. merged with Interlake Steamship Co. in 1913, and Sagamore became part of Interlake's fleet. Interlake sold the vessel to the Pringle Barge Line in 1922.) | Sold in 1922 to Pringle Barge Line; sold in 1947 to N.M. Peterson and renamed Kenordoc; scrapped in 1957. |
| Tycoon | Unpowered sailless barge | Pickands Mather | 1901 (Note: The vessel was first built in 1895.) | 1916 | Not known. |

== Bibliography ==
- American Bureau of Shipping (1898). Record of the American Bureau of Shipping. New York: American Bureau of Shipping. hdl:2027/nyp.33433019094519.
- American Bureau of Shipping (1904). Record of the American Bureau of Shipping. New York: American Bureau of Shipping. hdl:2027/nyp.33433019094204.
- American Bureau of Shipping (1905). Record of the American Bureau of Shipping. New York: American Bureau of Shipping. hdl:2027/nyp.33433019094212.
- American Bureau of Shipping (1906). Record of the American Bureau of Shipping. New York: American Bureau of Shipping. hdl:2027/nyp.33433019094220.
- American Bureau of Shipping (1933). Record of the American Bureau of Shipping. New York: American Bureau of Shipping.
- Ashworth, William (1987). The Late, Great Lakes: An Environmental History. Detroit: Wayne State University Press. ISBN 9780814318874.
- Bawal, Raymond A. (2008). Ships of the St. Clair River. St. Clair, Mich.: Inland Expressions. ISBN 9780981815718.
- Bawal, Raymond A. (2009). Twilight of the Great Lakes Steamer. Clinton Township, Mich.: Inland Expressions. ISBN 9780981815725.
- Bawal, Raymond A. (2011). Superships of the Great Lakes: Thousand-Foot Ships on the Great Lakes. Clinton Township, Mich.: Inland Expressions. ISBN 9780981815749.
- Beeson, Harvey C. (1900). Beeson's Marine Directory of the Northwestern Lakes. Chicago: The Beeson-Payne Co. hdl:2027/mdp.39015021114015.
- Beeson, Harvey C. (1901). Beeson's Marine Directory of the Northwestern Lakes. Chicago: The Beeson-Payne Co. hdl:2027/mdp.39015071185105.
- Beeson, Harvey C. (1902). Beeson's Marine Directory of the Northwestern Lakes. Chicago: The Beeson-Payne Co. hdl:2027/mdp.39015006414091.
- Beeson, Harvey C. (1908). Beeson's Marine Directory of the Northwestern Lakes. Chicago: The Beeson-Payne Co.
- Beeson, Harvey C. (1909). Beeson's Marine Directory of the Northwestern Lakes. Chicago: The Beeson-Payne Co.
- Beeson, Harvey C. (1914). Beeson's Marine Directory of the Northwestern Lakes. Chicago: Harvey C. Beeson.
- Blume, Kenneth J. (2012). Historical Dictionary of the U.S. Maritime Industrylocation=Lanham, Md. Scarecrow Press. ISBN 9780810856349.
- Bowlus, W. Bruce (2010). Iron Ore Transport on the Great Lakes: The Development of a Delivery System to Feed American Industry. Jefferson, N.C.: McFarland. ISBN 9780786433261.
- Brown, Curt (2008). So Terrible A Storm: A Tale of Fury on Lake Superior. Minneapolis: Voyageur Press. ISBN 9780760340127.
- Devendorf, John F. (1996). Great Lakes Bulk Carriers, 1869-1985. Niles, Mich.: J.F. Devendorf. ISBN 9781889043036.
- Great Lakes Register (1916). Great Lakes Register for the Construction and Classification of Steel and Wooden Vessels. Volume 18. Cleveland: Great Lakes Register. hdl:2027/mdp.39015057176235.
- Greenwood, John Orville (1973). Namesakes II: A Factual Photostory of Former Vessels on the Great Lakes and St. Lawrence River During the Period 1940–1972. Cleveland: Freshwater Press.
- Greenwood, John Orville (1997). The Five Fleets of James A. Paisley and Fourteen fleets of James Playfair. Cleveland: Freshwater Press. ISBN 9780912514345.
- Havighurst, Walter (1958). Vein of Iron: The Pickands, Mather Story. Cleveland, Ohio: World Publishing Co. hdl:2027/mdp.39015030606977.
- Joachim, George J. (1994). Iron Fleet: The Great Lakes in World War II. Detroit: Wayne State University Press. ISBN 9780814324790.
- Lloyd's Register of British and Foreign Shipping. London: Lloyd's Register of British and Foreign Shipping. 1902.
- Maritime Administration (September 1988). Bulk Carriers in the World Fleet (Report). Washington, D.C.: U.S. Department of Transportation. hdl:2027/uc1.c101834841.
- McCormick, Daniel C. (1972). The Wishbone Fleet. Massena, N.Y.: D. McCormick.
- McDowell, Carl E.; Gibbs, Helen M. (1999). Ocean Transportation. Washington, D.C.: BeardBooks. ISBN 9781893122451.
- Reynolds, Terry S.; Dawson, Virginia P. (2011). Iron Will: Cleveland-Cliffs and the Mining of Iron Ore, 1847–2006. Detroit, Michigan: Wayne State University Press. p. 109. ISBN 9780814336434.
- Mills, Rodney (2002). Wooden Steamers on the Great Lakes. Vermilion, Ohio: Great Lakes Historical Society. ISBN 9780940741003.
- Moody's Investors Service (1930). Moody's Manual of Investments. New York: Moody's Investors Service.
- Smith, Maurice D. (2005). Steamboats on the Lakes: Two Centuries of Steamboat Travel Through Ontario's Waterways. Toronto: J. Lorimer. ISBN 9781550288858.
- Stonehouse, Frederick (1985). Lake Superior's "Shipwreck Coast": A Survey of Maritime Accidents From Whitefish Bay's Point Iroquois to Grand Marais, Michigan. Au Train, Mich.: Avery Color Studios. ISBN 9780932212436.
- Thompson, Mark L. (1994). Queen of the Lakes. Detroit: Wayne State University Press. ISBN 9780814323939.
- U.S. Bureau of Marine Inspection and Navigation (1895). Merchant Vessels of the United States. Washington, D.C.: Government Printing Office.
- U.S. Bureau of Navigation (1917). Forty-Eighth Annual List of Merchant Vessels of the United States. Washington, D.C.: Government Printing Office.
- Van der Linden, Peter J.; Bascom, John H. (1984). Great Lakes Ships We Remember. Volume 1. Cleveland: Freshwater Press. ISBN 9780912514246.
- Wolff, Julius F. (1979). The Shipwrecks of Lake Superior. Duluth, Minn.: Lake Superior Marine Museum Association.
- Wright, Richard J. (1969). Freshwater Whales: A History of the American Ship Building Company and Its Predecessors. Kent, Ohio: Kent State University Press. ISBN 9780873380539.
