= James Barker =

James Barker may refer to:

- James Barker (athlete) (1892–1947), British track and field athlete
- James Barker (judge) (1839–1905), justice of the Massachusetts Supreme Judicial Court
- James Barker (Royal Navy officer) (1772–1838), captain in the Royal Navy
- James Barker (priest) (1667–1736), English priest, Archdeacon of Chichester
- James Barker (Rhode Island official) (1622–1702), British deputy governor of the Colony of Rhode Island and Providence Plantations
- James Barker in James Barker Band, Canadian country musician
- James A. Barker (1857–1943), Wisconsin state senator
- James Edward Barker (born 1980), British composer, music producer and film producer
- James Francis Barker (1872–1950), American academic; second president of the Rochester Athenæum and Mechanics Institute
- James Frazier Barker (born 1947), former president of Clemson University
- James L. Barker (1880–1955), American linguist and historian
- James Madison Barker (1886–1974), American banker and business executive
- James Nelson Barker (1784–1858), American soldier, playwright, mayor of Philadelphia
- James P. Barker, American soldier convicted of rape and the murder of an Iraqi family
- James R. Barker (academic) (fl. 2000s–2010s), professor of organizational theory and strategy
- James R. Barker (businessman) (fl. 1950s–2000s), shipping executive
- Jim Barker (born 1956), American gridiron football coach
- Jim Barker (politician) (1935–2005), Democratic politician from the U.S. state of Oklahoma
- James R. Barker (1976 ship)

== See also ==
- James Barker Edmonds (1832–1900), president of the board of commissioners for the District of Columbia
