= James R. Barker =

James R. Barker may refer to:

- James R. Barker (academic) (fl. 2000s–2010s), professor of organizational theory and strategy
- James R. Barker (businessman) (fl. 1950s–2000s), shipping executive
  - James R. Barker (1976 ship) named for the executive
