= MV Kaye E. Barker =

Self discharging lake freighter

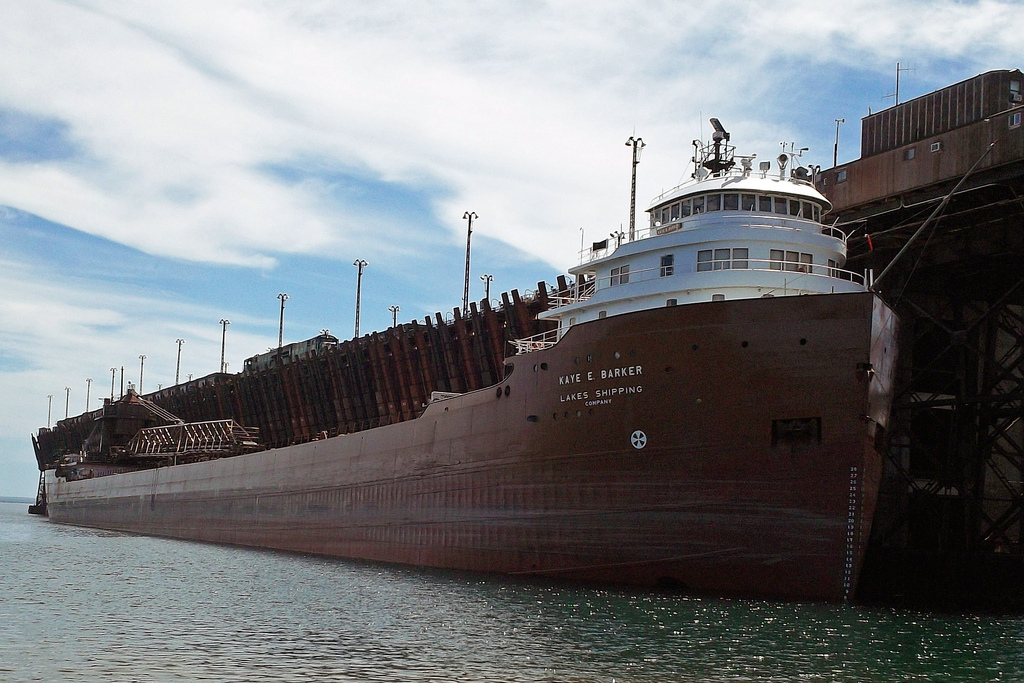
- MV Kaye E. Barker docked at Marquette, Michigan.

History

United States
- Owner: Cleveland Cliffs Steamship Company (1952–1985); Rouge Steel Company (1985–1989); Interlake Steamship Company (1989–present)
- Operator: Interlake Steamship Company
- Port of registry: Cleveland, Ohio
- Builder: American Ship Building Company
- Laid down: as SS Edward B. Greene
- Christened: January 10, 1952
- Completed: 1952
- Maiden voyage: July 29, 1952
- Renamed: 1985 SS Benson Ford; 1989 SS later MV Kaye E. Barker
- Identification: IMO number: 5097450; MMSI number: 366904910; Call sign: WCF3012

General characteristics
- Class & type: AAA-class bulk freighter
- Length: 767 ft (234 m)
- Beam: 70 ft (21 m)
- Depth: 36 ft (11 m)
- Propulsion: 2 × Rolls-Royce Bergen B32:40L6P 6-cylinder diesel engines
- Speed: 17 mph (15 kn; 27 km/h)
- Capacity: 25,900 tons

MV Kaye E. Barker is a self-discharging lake freighter owned and operated by the Interlake Steamship Company. She was originally built as SS Edward B. Greene, and was later renamed Benson Ford before being sold to Interlake and named MV Kaye E. Barker. The vessel primarily hauls hematite pellets, stone, and coal across the Great Lakes.

== Construction ==
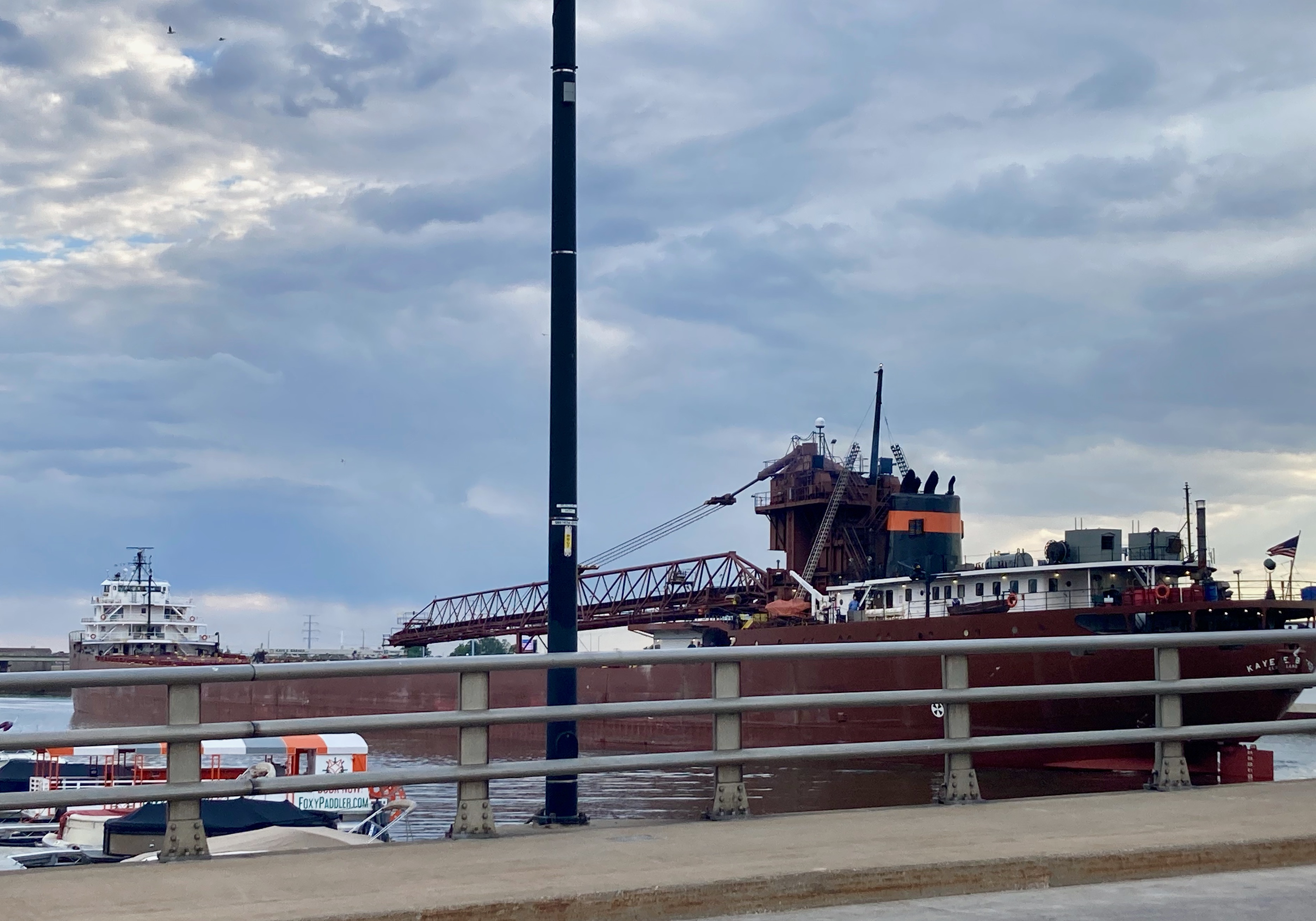
Kaye E. Barker on the Fox River in downtown Green Bay (2022)

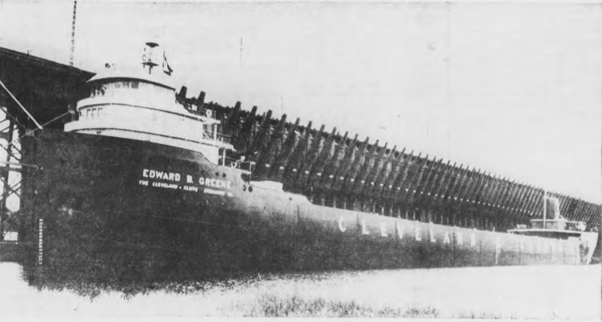
Edward B. Greene on her maiden voyage in 1952, docked at Marquette

MV Kaye E. Barker was constructed in Toledo, Ohio in 1952 for the Cleveland-Cliffs Steamship Company as SS Edward B. Greene, one of the eight AAA-class freighters used for ore and coal shipping. She was named for Edward B. Greene, the chairman and president of Cleveland Cliffs who retired that same year. Her AAA sister ships were SS Philip R. Clarke, SS Cason J. Callaway, SS Arthur M. Anderson, SS Reserve, SS J.L. Mauthe, SS Armco, and SS William Clay Ford. Edward B. Greene was the first lake freighter to be constructed entirely in drydock. Edward B. Greene differed from her seven AAA sisters in that she was constructed with an extra level to the forward deckhouse for more guest accommodations as she was to become the flagship of the Cleveland Cliffs' fleet. She was christened on January 10, 1952, with her sea trials beginning on June 18 of the same year. On her maiden voyage, which took place on July 29, 19,788 tons of iron ore were loaded to be shipped to Toledo from Marquette, Michigan.

=== Description ===
Edward B Greene was built 647 feet (197 m) long with a hull depth of 36 ft (11 m). It was powered by a 7,700-shaft-horsepower (5,700 kW) DeLaval steam turbine and was equipped with 24 hatches. It measured 11,726 gross register tons (GRT).

== Service history ==
Edward B. Greene hauled hematite pellets from ore docks in Marquette, Michigan, to steel refineries in Detroit.

In the winter of 1975–1976, Fraser Shipyards, Inc. was contracted by Cleveland Cliffs to lengthen Edward B. Greene with a 120-foot (37 m) mid-body section, increasing capacity to almost 27,000 tons. At the same time, six of the other AAA-class freighters were lengthened in the same way. In 1981, the ship was converted to a self-unloading vessel, with the addition of a 250-foot (76 m), aft-mounted boom.

In 1985, four years after the conversion, Edward B. Greene was purchased by Rouge Steel Company, originally a division of Ford Motor Company. Upon the ship's purchase, it was renamed SS Benson Ford III. Its new route stretched from Marquette to Detroit to supply the Ford plant there.

The Ford fleet was dissolved in 1989, leading to the Interlake Shipping Company's purchase of all remaining Ford ships. With the purchase, Interlake signed a contract to ship iron ore to the Rouge Steel plant. This created the Lakes Shipping Company, a new division of Interlake. With Interlake's purchase of Benson Ford III, the decision was made to rename it to SS Kaye E. Barker, after the wife of Interlake's president.

In 2012, Kaye E. Barker was repowered at Bay Shipbuilding in Sturgeon Bay, Wisconsin. Her steam turbine was replaced with two 6-cylinder Rolls-Royce Bergen diesel engines and other equipment. Along with these upgrades, Kaye E. Barker also received a replacement rudder and stock.
