= Pickands Mather Group =

American company which provides shipping of bulk commodities

- House flag
- Formerly: Pickands Mather & Company
- Company type: Subsidiary
- Industry: Rail, truck, and freighter and barge transportation of coal and bulk commodities; Purchasing, sales, and marketing of coal
- Founded: 1883 in Cleveland, Ohio, United States
- Founders: James Pickands, Samuel Livingston Mather II, and Jay C. Morse
- Headquarters: Kirtland, Ohio, United States
- Area served: Great Lakes region of the United States and Canada
- Parent: Privately held company
- Website: pickandsmather.com

The Pickands Mather Group is an American company which provides shipping of coal and other bulk commodities, and the purchase, sale, and marketing of bulk coal. Founded in 1883 as Pickands Mather & Company, it once had the second largest shipping fleet on the Great Lakes in the 1910s and 1920s. The company was purchased by the Diamond Shamrock Corporation in 1968, which in turn sold it to the Moore-McCormack Resources in 1973. Moore-McCormack sold Pickands Mather's mining interests to Cleveland-Cliffs in 1986. Moore-McCormack then spun off the Interlake Steamship Company to James Barker (former CEO of Moore-McCormack) and Paul R. Tregurtha (former CFO of Moore-McCormack) in 1987. Pickands Mather was sold to a management group in 1992, and continues to operate as a private company.

== History ==
Pickands Mather and Company was formed in 1883 by James Pickands, Samuel Mather, and Jay C. Morse. Pickands had risen to the rank of colonel in the 124th Ohio Volunteer Infantry during the American Civil War. In 1867, he moved to Marquette, Michigan, where he opened a hardware store selling tools and supplies to iron mining companies. He opened a fuel coal supply business three years later. He was elected mayor of Marquette in 1875, and five years later formed the Taylor Iron Co. (an iron mining concern) with Jay C. Morse. After Pickands' wife died in 1882, he moved to Cleveland. Jay C. Morse was a shipping agent for the Cleveland Iron Mining Company in Marquette. He invested widely in Michigan iron mines, and by 1882 was a wealthy man ready to form his own company. Samuel Mather was the son of Samuel Livingston Mather, founder of the Cleveland Iron Mining Company. While recuperating from a mining accident, he met and married Flora Stone, daughter of Cleveland industrialist and railroad magnate Amasa Stone. Determined to make his own fortune and impress his father-in-law, Mather sought out business partners. Pickands Mather and Company was formed in 1883, dealing in iron ore and pig iron, and mining iron ore from two mines in the Marquette Iron Range.

In the 1880s and 1890s, Pickands Mather rapidly added to their iron mine holdings, and expanded into coal mining, iron ore and coal shipping, dock ownership, and the manufacture of coke and iron and steel rolling mills. In April 1886, Mather hired local stenographer Harry Coulby, who swiftly worked his way up in the corporate ranks to become head of the company's Marine Department. After some years leasing and managing the freighters of other companies, in 1894 Pickands Mather formed the Interlake Company (later the Interlake Steamship Company). By 1912, Interlake had grown to be the second-largest shipping fleet on the Great Lakes, with 37 freighters. The Interlake fleet expanded to 52 ships in 1916.

After 1900, Pickands Mather began acquiring blast furnaces to manufacture pig iron, and continued to expand its iron mining interests. By the 1920s, the company was the second-largest iron mining company in the United States. It formed a subsidiary, the Interlake Iron Corp., to hold its smelters, and expanded coal mining into Kentucky, Pennsylvania, and West Virginia. In the 1930s, Pickands Mather began researching how to turn taconite into a usable form of iron ore. This research bore fruit in the 1940s, and Pickands Mather formed the Erie Mining Co. to process taconite into usable taconite pellets. Pickands Mather was making large profits from taconite within a decade.

Coulby died in 1929 and Mather in 1931. Elton Hoyt II, who had succeeded Coulby as head of the Marine Department in 1929, became president and chief executive officer of Pickands Mather in 1939. He died in March 1955, and was succeeded by John Sherwin. To enable the company to better meet the challenges of the rapidly changing economic environment, Sherwin incorporated Pickands Mather in 1960.

In 1968, Sherwin engineered the sale of Pickands Mather to the Diamond Shamrock Corporation, a Cleveland-based shipping, chemical manufacturing, and oil refining and consumer sales company. Diamond Shamrock held the company for just four years. In December 1972, Diamond Shamrock sold Pickands Mather for $66 million to the Moore-McCormack Company, operator of a large fleet of international freighters and some of the last American-owned passenger ocean liners. (The sale did not include Pickands Mather's chemical manufacturing arm.) The sale was consummated by 36-year-old James R. Barker, Moore-McCormack's CEO and a former mid-level manager in the Marine Vessel Department of Pickands Mather from 1963 to 1967. Paul R. Tregurtha, Moore-McCormack's chief financial officer, oversaw the financing of the purchase.

In the 1970s, Interlake Steamship Co. disposed of a large number of its smaller ships and built three 1,000-foot (300 m) long Great Lakes freighters: the MV James R. Barker, the MV Mesabi Miner, and the MV William J. Delancey (now MV Paul R. Tregurtha). In 1973, Elton Hoyt III was named president and chief executive officer of Pickands Mather, a position he held until his retirement in 1983. Continuing downward price pressure on commodities and shipping rates significantly harmed Pickands Mather's revenues in the 1970s and 1980s. In July 1986, LTV Steel (the successor company to the Jones and Laughlin Steel Company and Republic Steel) filed for bankruptcy, citing $4 billion in debt. The economic shock to the Pickands Mather's iron and coal investments caused by the default of one of the largest consumers of its products deeply alarmed Moore-McCormack Resources (the successor to the Moore-McCormack Company). Moore-McCormack sold the iron and coal mining businesses of Pickands Mather to Cleveland-Cliffs Inc. in November 1986 for an undisclosed sum. The price was later revealed to be 2 million barrels of oil and natural gas reserves owned by Cleveland-Cliffs.

Cleveland Cliffs (later Cliffs Natural Resources) appointed George Newcombe Chandler II the president of the Pickands Mather subsidiary in 1987. He retired from the company in 2000. Moore-McCormack, however, retained control of the Interlake Steamship Company. But in early 1987, Barker resigned from Moore-McCormack and bought the Interlake Steamship Company from Moore-McCormack. Paul R. Tregurtha joined Barker in managing the company, which was now a privately held company.

Pickands Mather was sold by Cliffs in 1992 in a private transaction to management. The company ships coal and other bulk commodities via railroad, truck, barge, and lake freighter. It also purchases coal at the mine-head and sells it directly to customers, as well as provides assistance to coal companies and distributors in marketing bulk coal.

== See also ==
- List of Pickands Mather ships
- Mather Mine disaster

== Bibliography ==
- Bawal, Raymond A. (2011). Superships of the Great Lakes: Thousand-Foot Ships on the Great Lakes. Clinton Township, Mich.: Inland Expressions. ISBN 9780981815749.
- Brown, Curt (2008). So Terrible a Storm: A Tale of Fury on Lake Superior. Minneapolis: Voyageur Press. ISBN 9781610602556.
- Havighurst, Walter (1958). Vein of Iron: The Pickands, Mather Story. Cleveland, Ohio: World Publishing Co. hdl:2027/mdp.39015030606977.
- McKendree, Elroy (1918). A History of Cleveland and Its Environs, the Heart of New Connecticut. Volume III. Chicago: Lewis Publishing Co.
- Reynolds, Terry S.; Dawson, Virginia P. (2011). Iron Will: Cleveland-Cliffs and the Mining of Iron Ore, 1847-2006. Detroit: Wayne State University Press. ISBN 9780814336434.
- Wicklund, Dick (September–October 2009). "'Yes, Mr. Coulby!' Part Three" (PDF). Lake Huron Lore: 13–18. Archived from the original (PDF) on March 4, 2016.
