= SS Samoset =

SS Samoset may refer to one of two Type T3-S-A1 tankers built for the United States Maritime Commission by Bethlehem Sparrows Point Shipyard:

- SS Samoset (1942) (MC hull number 516), became USS Chiwawa (AO-68); sold for commercial use in 1946
- SS Samoset (1943) (MC hull number 522), scrapped in 1966
