= SS Clifton =

Whaleback Great Lakes freighter

Coordinates: 44.360050°N 82.570133°W

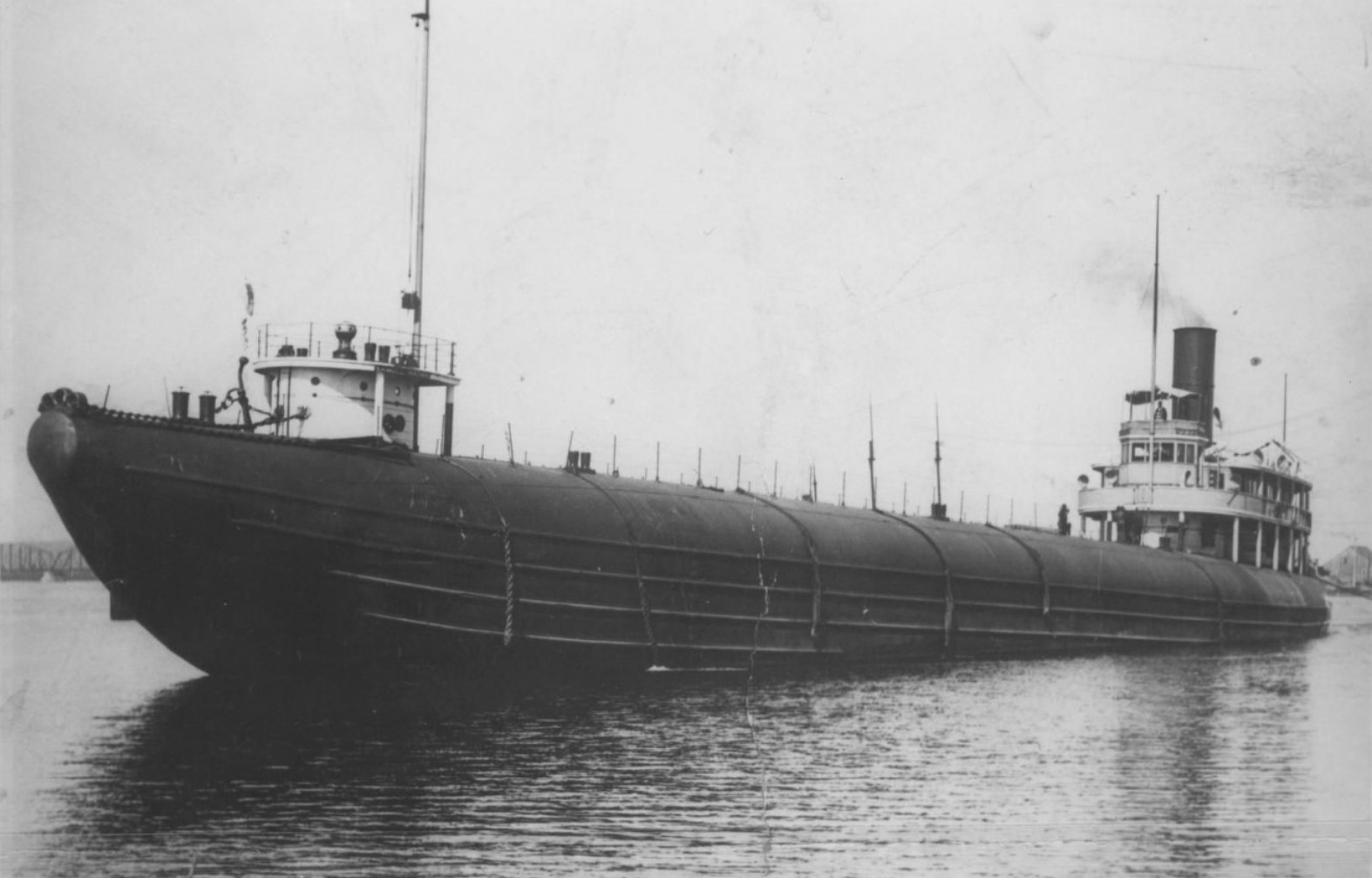
- SS Clifton, without self-unloading gear

History

United States
- Name: Clifton
- Namesake: Samuel Livingston Mather II
- Owner: Progress Steamship company, Cleveland, a subsidiary of Cleveland-Cliffs, Inc.
- Port of registry: (United States) Cleveland, Ohio
- Builder: American Steel Barge Company
- Laid down: West Superior, Wisconsin
- Launched: 1892
- Completed: 1892
- Fate: Sank near Thunder Bay Island during storm, September 21–22, 1924
- Notes: Prior owner Pickands, Mather & Company Refit 1923–1924 to include installation of topside self-unloading gear

General characteristics
- Type: Whaleback freighter
- Length: 308 ft (94 m)
- Beam: 30 ft (9.1 m)
- Depth: 24 ft (7.3 m)
- Propulsion: Steam, propeller
- Capacity: 3,500 tons
- Crew: 26

SS Clifton, originally SS Samuel Mather, was a whaleback lake freighter built in 1892 for service on the Great Lakes. She was 308 foot (94 m) long, with a 30-foot (9.1 m) beam, a 24-foot (7.3 m) depth and had a 3,500-ton capacity. The self-propelled barge was built by the American Steel Barge Company in West Superior, Wisconsin. Her builders used a design well-suited to carry iron ore, her intended trade. The new vessel was christened Samuel Mather, after a cofounder of Pickands Mather and Company, which at the time was the second largest fleet on the Great Lakes.

After 31 years of service as an ore boat, the vessel was superannuated out of iron ore and was refitted as a carrier of stone aggregate. Her 1923–1924 refitting included the installation of topside self-unloading gear. The Smith-patented tunnel scrapers were intended to enable the ship to unload more quickly and to partially offload at ports that could not previously be serviced by ship. En route between Sturgeon Bay and Detroit on the night of September 21–22, 1924, while loaded with crushed stone, she encountered a storm and sank off Lake Huron's Saginaw Bay with the loss of the vessel's captain and the crew. (Note: Some sources say that there were 28 crew, but the contemporaneous listing was 26.)

According to one historian, Clifton became a "ghost ship of the Great Lakes", as there were no survivors and the events immediately leading up to the disaster were not known. The vessel's wreck was discovered on the bed of Lake Huron by technical divers in September 2016, with the discovery confirmed by further dives and research in 2017. When the lost vessel was rediscovered, it was found that a poetic folk ballad, written before 1932 by an Irish-American neighbor of the lost captain, contained a relatively accurate description of the ship's foundering.

== History ==
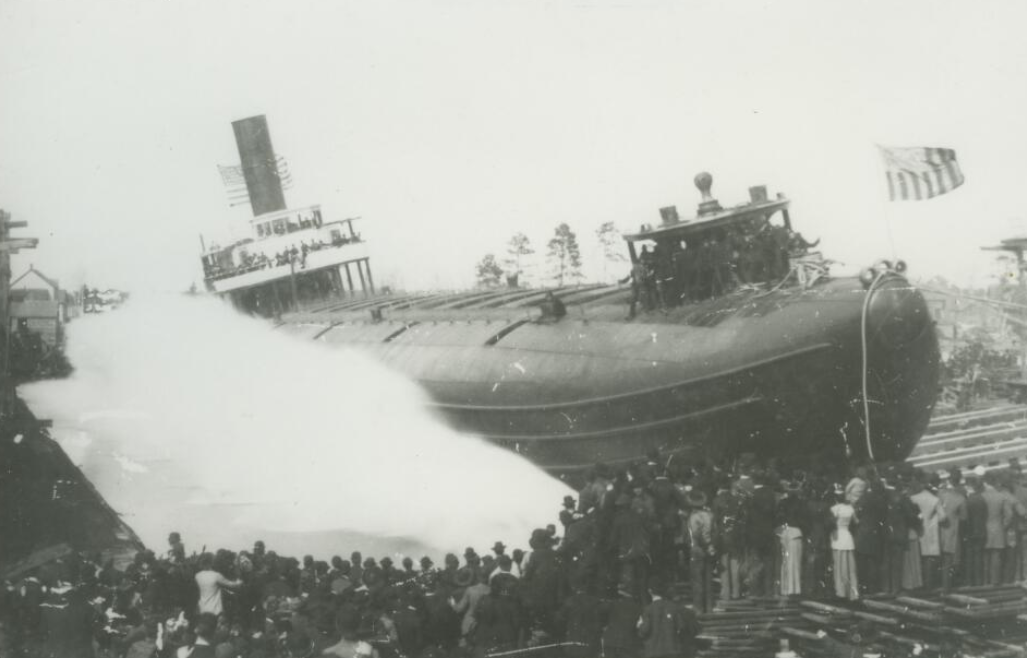
The launching of Clifton

=== Construction and service ===
Clifton was built by the American Steel Barge Co. and launched in 1892. Designed by Captain Alexander McDougall, whalebacks had a unique form. Their unusual design included a hull that curved, which when fully loaded resembled a whale's back. They were the precursors of the turret deck ship of the late 19th and early 20th century, which like the whaleback had rounded hulls, but unlike the whaleback had conventional bows and sterns and a superstructure. A total of 44 whaleback vessels were constructed from 1887 to 1898, with most operating in the Great Lakes. (Note: Charles W. Wetmore was the first to leave the Great Lakes in June 1891, sailing to London and from there to the west coast of the United States, where it was lost. City of Everett was an important whaleback steamship. It was constructed in the State of Washington, sailed from 1894 until 1923, and was the first U.S. steamship to pass through the Suez Canal as well as the first to circumnavigate the globe.)

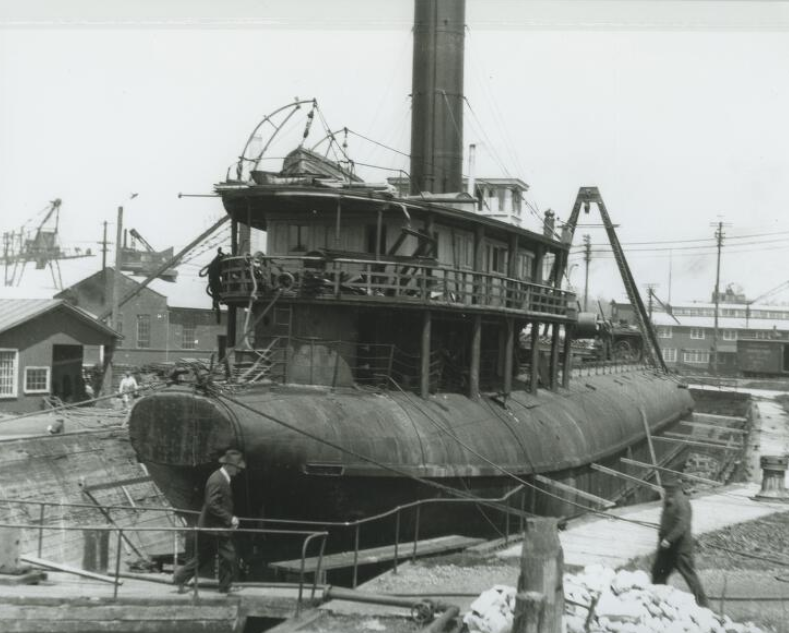
Clifton in dry dock

As Samuel Mather, she was the second of seven U.S. merchant ships to bear that name. The eponymously-named Samuel Mather, also known as Clifton, was built at the personal expense of Samuel Livingston Mather II, a cofounder of Pickands Mather and Company. For the better part of the twentieth century's first two decades, the company operated the second largest shipping fleet on the Great Lakes.

After sailing for 31 years, she was deemed superannuated. The ship would no longer transport iron ore and instead was retrofitted as a carrier of stone aggregate. This 1923–1924 refit included the installation of topside self-unloading gear, which affected her center of gravity and righting moment. As wreck discoverer David Trotter stated: "We found that the self-unloading mechanism was still in position, and that was an interesting discovery because we now realize that the unloading mechanism didn’t break free, causing the Clifton to have instability, resulting in her sinking." The self-unloading machinery "was added the same year she disappeared," responded maritime expert Valerie Van Heest. (Note: Valerie van Heest is a member of the Michigan Shipwreck Research Association's board of directors. The nonprofit group is instrumental in preserving and interpreting Michigan's maritime history.) She said the discovery has many levels of significance. She said, "All of it was additional weight above the center line of the vessel", and that it was not coincidental that three other ships outfitted with an identical self-unloading system all sank. (Note: Andaste was retrofitted with a self loader and lost on September 9, 1929 in Lake Michigan with its entire crew. A similar retrofit and sinking involved Hennepin) Four of the refitted ships were lost in relatively quick progression.

== Sinking ==
=== Loss ===
At the time of her loss, Clifton was owned by the Progress Steamship Co. of Cleveland, a subsidiary of Cleveland-Cliffs, Inc.

In Clifton's last position report as of 10:20 a.m. on September 21, 1924, it was entering Lake Huron near Mackinaw City approximately 100 miles (160 km) from where it ultimately foundered. As the gravel boat tried to make its way down Lake Huron toward its scheduled destination in Detroit on the night of September 21–22, a "great storm swept [Lake] Huron". In the opinion of an experienced skipper who had worked his way through the gale, no vessel of Clifton's size could have survived in those conditions if she was 40 miles (64 km) out to sea.

Wreckage was widely scattered. Painted sticks from Clifton were recovered by Peter White on September 26, 1924, 24 miles (39 km) northeast of Pointe aux Barques Light, and a life raft was found on October 1, 1924. On the Detour, Michigan–Goderich, Ontario course, about 70 miles (110 km) away from the latter, hatch covers, and the forward end of a pilot house (with searchlight and clock attached) were recovered by Glencairn. The clock had stopped at 4:00, which is hypothesized to have been 4:00 a.m. on September 22, when storm waters on Lake Huron were at their height. A cabin door was found in the vicinity of Thunder Bay. (Note: The locale where the wreck was ultimately located.) United States Army Air Service airplanes were dispatched from Mount Clemens, Michigan, to conduct a search in Saginaw Bay in the vicinity of Tawas City, Michigan. (Note: Presumably from Selfridge Air Base, which is the only air base near Mount Clemens.) Debris started washing up on the Canadian shore.

No bodies were recovered, implying that the sinking was quick without deployment of lifeboats. No mechanical malfunction has yet been discovered or any other definite cause of her sinking. Speculation at the time, which continued to be published decades after the tragedy, was that the newly-installed self-unloading gear could have broken free and contributed to the vessel's metacentric instability. However, after the discovery of the wreck it is now theorized that the vessel was overwhelmed by a wave or waves that drove it under power to the bottom. The obliteration of the first 40 feet (12 m) of the bow is testament to the blunt force the ship endured. "The bow of the Clifton sustained heavy damage", said Trotter, after having seen footage shot by the divers. “The first 40 feet of the bow section is completely destroyed, likely caused by the impact with the lake’s bottom when she sank."

=== Lament ===
Three of the men lost with the ship, including the vessel's captain, were from the maritime community of Beaver Island, Michigan. The island community, which at the time was predominantly Irish-American, maintained the tradition of generating a folk-song lament for persons who were seen as having laid down their lives with heroism, and a ballad was written in honor of the crew of Clifton.

Attributed to islander Frank McCauley and collected by a folklore researcher in 1932, "The Seaman's Lament" purports to tell the story of the lost captain and crew. Lines 23 through 26 of the lament are of particular interest, as they set forth a hypothesis that the doomed vessel was slewed by a series of waves, an action equivalent to broaching on a sailing ship. Once slewed, the cargo vessel was swamped and then foundered.

And the mad billows leap like wild beasts from their lair,
And in their wild rush not a life will they spare!
And as they roll on over that structure of steel,
The steamer does tremble from foretop to keel.

These lines proved to be significant when the vessel was found, as they matched the physical condition of the hull on the lake bottom.

=== Discovery ===
Ever since the 1924 sinking, the wreck was considered an ultimate goal for wreck hunters, partly because of its confounding disappearance, and partly because it was the only remaining whaleback to have sunk in Lake Huron and not be found. Exacerbating the problem was the sheer size of Lake Huron and potential ship gravesites. The lake has about 25,000 square miles (65,000 km^{2}) with over 9,000 square miles (23,000 km^{2}) on the United States side. The data on potential sites was obscure and very oblique, leaving widely scattered possibilities.

David Trotter, a shipwreck author, discoverer, deep diver, and maritime archeologist, told the press that the lost vessel had been on his "bucket list", ranking close to #1 among non-found Great Lakes shipwrecks. (Note: Trotter offered that only finding Le Griffon, a ship lost in 1679, could be better.) At the time of the discovery, Trotter had found over 60 previously undiscovered wrecks while diving over the last 40 years. Some of his discoveries include sidewheel steamer Keystone State (1861 sinking with all hands); four-masted schooner, Minnedosa (1905 with all hands); and the 436-foot (133 m) Hydrus, lost with all hands in the 1913 Great Storm on Lake Huron.

Trotter started his search for Clifton in 1987. Almost 30 years later, in June 2016, he and his team logged the coordinates of an unknown wreck. He stated that they had been working on a project that involved two other wrecks. The team dived the unknown lost vessel in September 2016, and when the diver surfaced, he reported to Trotter that the unidentified vessel was "a whaleback". Trotter instantly told his crew that they might well have discovered Clifton, as it was the only as-yet-undiscovered whaleback to have been lost on Lake Huron. The senior diver wanted additional confirmation of this discovery before making it public. After deputizing several team members with action cameras, it was clear that the wreck was indeed a whaleback and was therefore Clifton. Trotter's divers further explored and video-documented the wreck, making nine dives in July–August 2017. Careful work was necessary, as the long-lost hull had been found approximately 100 miles (160 km) from where she had been last seen and was believed to have sunk. Trotter made the identification public in September 2017. The delay made it possible for the news to be formally released on September 21, 2017, the 93rd anniversary of the vessel's last surface sighting. Trotter said that the discovery was "a personal milestone" in a quest that he was fortunate enough to complete within his lifetime.

Trotter told the press that Clifton's propeller is intact and its rudder pointing straight. Both data points suggest the vessel was moving in a straight line when it sank. Now, "she lies heavily on her port side, [indicating] that she got caught broadside by a very large wave". These factors of the discovery tend to support the McCauley hypothesis of the sinking, as opposed to speculation that the vessel's self-unloading gear had broken its rigging and was swinging from side to side. The hull rests at a 45-degree angle to the lake bottom, consistent with being broadsided by a large wave.

== Legacy ==
The disaster has been memorialized by Frank McCauley's poetic lament. In addition, marine historian and maritime artist Robert McGreevy rendered a drawing of Clifton "fighting for her life" before she sank in the storm, and another of it resting on the bottom.

The sinking has been likened to the losses of Edmund Fitzgerald, Carl D. Bradley, and Daniel J. Morrell.

Dwight Boyer discussed the 1882 foundering of Asia, the 1924 vanishing of the whaleback Clifton with all hands, the 1927 disappearance of the package freighter Kamloops, and the 1929 foundering of the car ferry Milwaukee, in Ghost Ships of the Great Lakes (1968), and retold an account of the 1975 disappearance of Edmund Fitzgerald in his last book, Ships and Men of the Great Lakes (1977).
