= SS Arthur M. Anderson =

American Great Lakes freighter

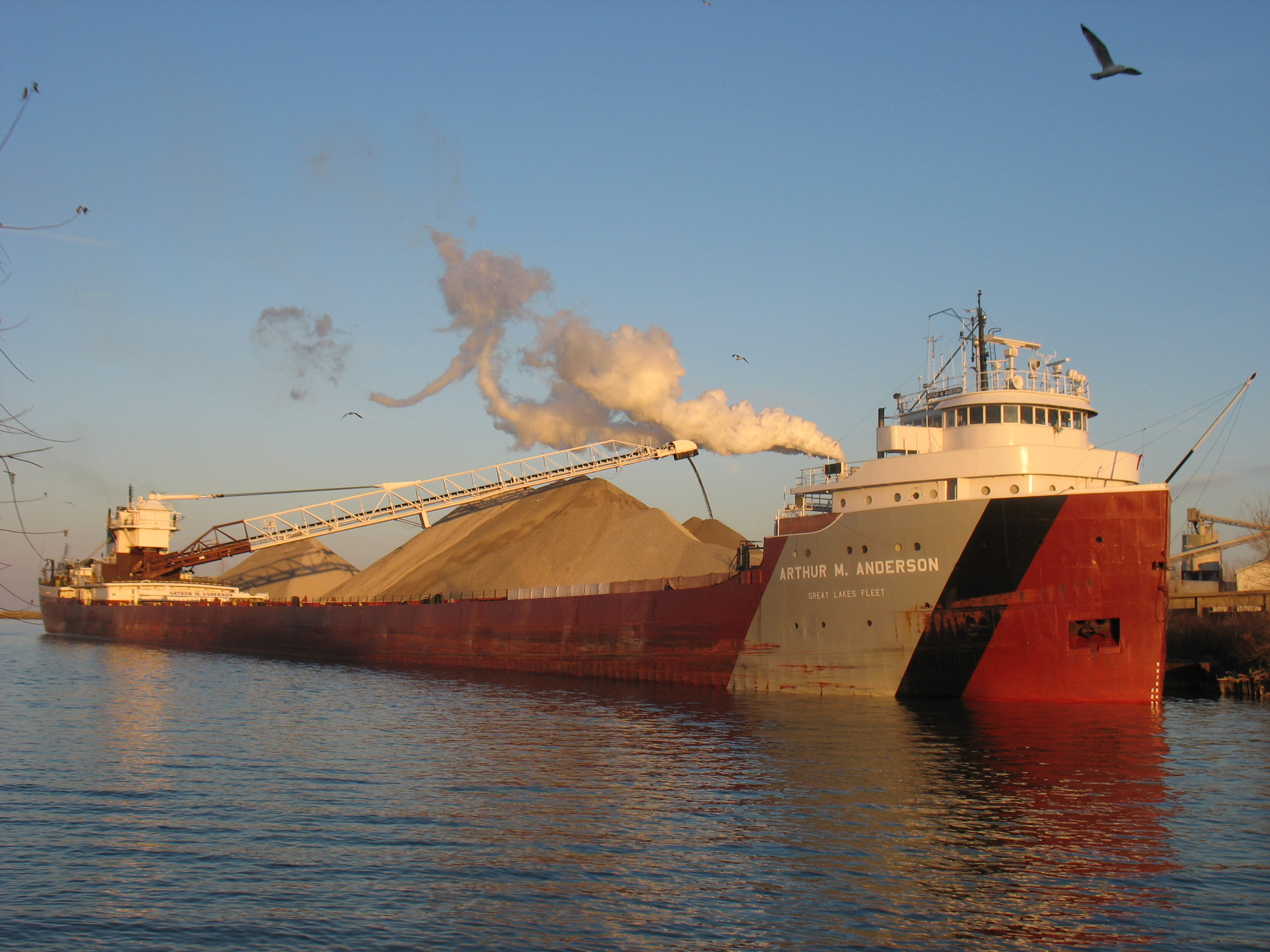
- Arthur M. Anderson unloading at Huron, Ohio in 2008.

History
- Name: SS Arthur M. Anderson
- Namesake: Arthur Marvin Anderson
- Operator: Great Lakes Fleet
- Port of registry: (United States) Duluth, Minnesota
- Builder: American Ship Building Company of Lorain, Ohio
- Yard number: 868
- Launched: February 16, 1952
- Acquired: August 7, 1952
- Identification: IMO number: 5025691; MMSI number: 366972020; Call sign: WDH7563
- Status: Laid-up in Toledo, Ohio

General characteristics
- Class & type: Lake freighter
- Tonnage: 26,525 GT
- Length: 647 ft (197 m) (as built); 767 ft (234 m) (Note: During the winter of 1974–1975, she was lengthened 120 feet by Fraser Shipyards, Superior, Wisconsin to an overall length of 767 feet)
- Beam: 70 ft (21 m)
- Draft: 36 ft (11 m)
- Propulsion: Westinghouse Electric Corporation Double-Reduction Geared Steam Turbine at 7,700 shp (5,700 kW)
- Speed: approx. 15.1 knots (28.0 km/h; 17.4 mph)
- Capacity: 25,300 tons

SS Arthur M. Anderson is an American lake freighter. She is famous for being the last ship to be in contact with SS Edmund Fitzgerald before she sank on November 10, 1975. Arthur M. Anderson was also the first rescue ship on the scene in a vain search for Edmund Fitzgerald's survivors. The vessel's namesake, Arthur Marvin Anderson, was director of U.S. Steel, a member of its finance committee and vice chairman of J.P. Morgan & Co. at the time. The ship was launched in 1952 and is currently laid-up in Toledo, Ohio.

== History ==
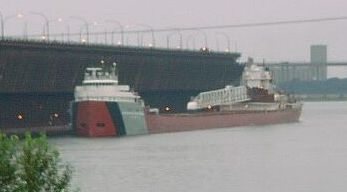
SS Arthur M. Anderson in August 2002 at a Duluth ore dock.

Arthur M. Anderson came out of the drydock of the American Ship Building Company of Lorain, Ohio in 1952. She had a length of 647 feet (197 m), a 70-foot (21 m) beam, a 36-foot (11 m) depth, and a gross tonnage of roughly 21,000 tons. She was second of eight of the AAA class of lake freighters; the others being, in order, SS Philip R. Clarke, SS Cason J. Callaway, SS Reserve, SS J.L. Mauthe, SS Armco, SS Edward B. Greene, and SS William Clay Ford. Arthur M. Anderson, along with Philip R. Clarke and Cason J. Callaway, were built for the Pittsburgh Steamship Division of U.S. Steel. Arthur M. Anderson's sea trials commenced on August 7, 1952, and she loaded her first cargo at the Two Harbors dock on August 12, 1952. She received several refits in her life including the addition of a new 120-foot (37 m) midsection in 1975 which added about 6,000 tons to her gross tonnage, bringing the total to about 26,000 tons. During the Lake Superior storm on November 10, 1975, she was operating in close company with SS Edmund Fitzgerald and reported her loss to the United States Coast Guard. In 1981, she received a self-unloading boom which improved her cargo loading and unloading. She is unique among the three Great Lakes Fleet steamships in that she has a softer midsection that prohibits loading as much cargo as the others; roughly 1500 tons less.

In February 2015 Arthur M. Anderson became stuck and stranded in several feet of ice in Lake Erie near Conneaut Harbor, Ohio. Arthur M. Anderson was freed from the ice on February 21, 2015, after five days with the help of the Canadian Coast Guard vessel CCGS Griffon. CCGS Samuel Risley was slated to escort Arthur M. Anderson to Detroit. USCGC Bristol Bay had also become stranded while attempting to free the ship from the up to 10-foot (3.0 m) thick ice.

Arthur M. Anderson was put on long-term lay-up in Duluth, Minnesota on January 15, 2017, at the end of the 2016 shipping season. In April 2019, she was transferred to the nearby Fraser Shipyards for a five-year survey and refitting to prepare for her return to service. The vessel returned to service on July 25, 2019.
