= SS Samuel Mather =

Seven merchant ships have been named SS Samuel Mather.

- SS Samuel Mather (1887), U.S. propeller, bulk freighter, Official No. 116142.
- SS Samuel Mather (1892), also known as SS Clifton, U.S. propeller-whaleback, Official No. 116484.
- SS Samuel Mather (1906), U.S. propeller, Official No. 203407.
- SS Samuel Mather (1926), U.S. propeller, Official No. 225409.
- SS William Mclauchlan, U.S. propeller built in 1926, renamed SS Samuel Mather from 1966–1975, Official No. 226176.
- SS Henry II Ford, U.S. propeller built in 1924, renamed SS Samuel Mather from 1989 - 1994 but never operated under that name, Official No. 223,980.
- SS Frank Armstrong, U.S. propeller built in 1943, renamed SS Samuel Mather in 1976, Official No. 243425.
