= SS Spartan =

Railroad car ferry

Coordinates: 43.948449°N 86.450362°W

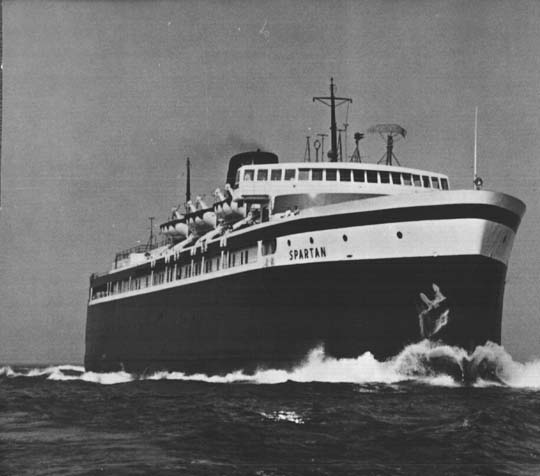
- SS Spartan sailing on Lake Michigan in her prime

History

United States
- Name: Spartan
- Namesake: Michigan State University
- Owner: Interlake Maritime Services
- Operator: Lake Michigan Carferry
- Port of registry: Ludington, Michigan
- Builder: Christy Corporation, Sturgeon Bay, Wisconsin
- Yard number: Hull No. 369
- Launched: 4 January 1952
- Christened: 6 September 1952
- In service: October 1952
- Out of service: November 1979
- Identification: Official No. 264500; IMO number: 5336387
- Nickname(s): The mighty Spartan
- Status: Laid up

General characteristics
- Type: Ferry
- Tonnage: 4,244 GRT
- Length: 410 ft 6 in (125.12 m)
- Beam: 59 ft 6 in (18.14 m)
- Depth: 24 ft (7.32 m) molded depth
- Installed power: Steam, coal-fired
- Propulsion: Two compound Skinner Unaflow steam engines, totaling 7,560 hp (5.64 MW); four Foster-Wheeler water-tube type D boilers, 450 psi (3.10 MPa)
- Speed: 18 mph (15.6 kn; 29.0 km/h)
- Capacity: 620 passengers, 180 automobiles, also tour buses, RVs, motorcycles, and commercial trucks

SS Spartan is a retired railroad car ferry on Lake Michigan owned by the Chesapeake and Ohio Railway (C&O) from 1952 through 1979. The ship alternated routes from Ludington, Michigan, to Milwaukee, Kewaunee, and Manitowoc, Wisconsin.

== Commissioning and early history ==
The C&O fully absorbed the Pere Marquette Railway in 1947, inheriting the car ferry service already established in Ludington. The division became known as the "Pere Marquette District" of the C&O railroad. There were already several car ferries working out of Ludington at the time, including the Pere Marquette 21 and Pere Marquette 22, the City of Saginaw 31 and City of Flint 32, and the City of Midland 41. C&O decided to improve its ferry fleet by adding two new ships. While similar in design to the immensely popular City of Midland 41, the new ships would have several notable design changes, such as a full-width pilot house that gave the crew an almost 360-degree view, and new lifeboat davits that freed up deck space.

Hull 369, which would become the Spartan began construction in late 1950 by the Christy Corporation of Sturgeon Bay, Wisconsin. She was launched on 4 January 1952 without fanfare; the Badger was being built at the same time, and the owners preferred a double-christening ceremony. During construction, many cities on both sides of Lake Michigan lobbied for their names to go on the new ships, as was the tradition with previous Pere Marquette car ferries (i.e. City of Midland 41). C&O decided that fewer feelings would be hurt if the twin ferries were named Spartan and Badger, after the mascots of Michigan State University (then Michigan State College) and the University of Wisconsin. The ships were christened on 6 September 1952 after the Badger was successfully launched. The Spartan completed her sea trials on 27 September 1952 and was delivered to C&O on 23 October. She was the first carferry to enter Ludington's harbor since a strike idled C&O boats on 4 July. The strike ended at noon on 25 October. Six hours later, Spartan entered service when she departed Ludington for Kewaunee, Wisconsin.

== Abandonment and the final years ==
In the mid-1970s, the C&O railway decided that the car ferries were no longer profitable to operate and petitioned the Interstate Commerce Commission to allow them to abandon the ferry routes. There were only three ferries left in service by this point: the City of Midland 41 (built in 1940), the Badger, and the Spartan. In 1978, C&O was granted permission to systematically eliminate its ferry routes. There was no longer a need for three ferries, and in September 1979 the Spartan was laid up in Ludington. In spring 1980 she was steamed up again to run as part of a lease agreement with the Ann Arbor Railroad, then operated by the Michigan Interstate Railway, out of Frankfort, Michigan, but was abandoned after it was discovered Frankfort harbor was too shallow for the Spartan. The ship was tied up at Ludington's number 3 1/2 slip for many years. She has since been moved to number 2 1/2 slip.

== Since 1992 ==
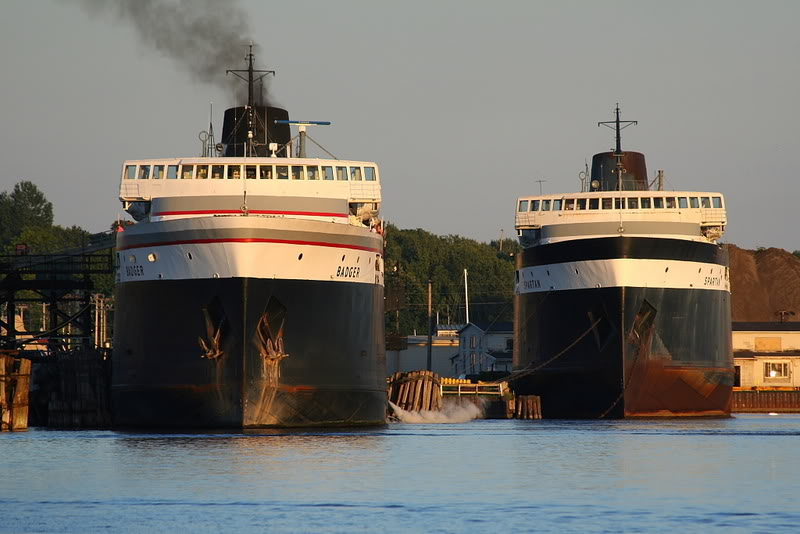
SS Spartan (right) laid up in number 2 1/2 slip and her sister ship SS Badger docked at number 2 slip in Ludington, Michigan

In 1992, Ludington resident Charles Conrad formed Lake Michigan Carferry Service and acquired all three ships. Originally, he planned to begin service with the Badger, then they would have the Spartan join her as demand increased. While demand for the new service had been steady over the years, it never quite reached level required for a second ferry. SS Spartan today sits at Ludington's 2 1/2 slip, one of the last of the true railroad-car ferries remaining. Due to the rarity of her coal-burning Skinner Unaflow steam engines that she and the Badger share, the Spartan has been used frequently as a parts ship to keep her twin running. There were also occasions she had been used for police training. In the early 2000s, when a new passenger ferry service was proposed from Muskegon, Michigan to Milwaukee, Wisconsin, Lake Michigan Carferry (the owners of the Badger and Spartan since 1992) proposed a diesel-converted Spartan as the ship of choice for the run. But that proposal was rejected in favor of the high-speed Lake Express.

In December 2020, the Spartan was sold to Interlake Steamship Company. The deal also includes the City of Midland 41 and SS Badger. It was a part of a larger sale of assets. Interlake is based in Middleburg Heights, Ohio.

In late 2021, Lake Michigan Carferry General Manager Sara Spore said that they had engineers conduct a survey of the Spartan in order to see what they can do with her, if anything.
