= Interlake Steamship Company =

American freight ship company that operates a fleet on the Great Lakes

House flag

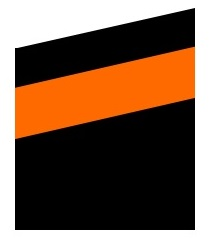
Interlake Steamship Company stack markings

The Interlake Steamship Company is an American freight ship company that operates a fleet on the Great Lakes in North America. It is now part of Interlake Maritime Services.

The company is chaired by James R. Barker, with his son, Mark W. Barker, serving as President. Paul R. Tregurtha serves as Vice-Chairman of the company.

== Founding and early company operations ==
Interlake Steamship Company was founded in 1913 when a consortium of firms bought out the seventeen vessels of the Gilchrist Company, which had gone into receivership. The other firms were: the Lackawanna Steamship Company, the Acme Steamship Company, the Standard Steamship Company, the Provident Steamship Company and the Huron Barge Company. The combined fleet operated 56 vessels.

=== 1913 Merger ===
The new stock issued in exchange for the old companies' stocks was computed based on the average of (1) appraised value of each old company (2) earning power in 1912 of each old company. From this was subtracted outstanding debt of each company (totaling $1,335,300) which was assumed by the new company and retired in 1913. In other words, the par value of common stock was valued equal to cash at the time of the merger. The 17 ships of the Gilchrist Transportation Company were bought for $2,362,669 in cash. An insurance fund was created and funded with an initial cash deposit of $250,000. Self-insurance becoming viable with a large enough number of ships was an explicit motive for the merger. The cash required was obtained by the sale of $3 million in bonds at 97 and the sale at par of $1,196,807 in stock. The Lackawanna Steamship Company as the surviving company was renamed to Interlake Steamship Company. Pickands, Mather & Co had the controlling interest.

Company	Incorporated	Date	Ships	Tons	Consideration (common stock par value)
Lackawanna SS Co.	Ohio	Oct 14, 1906	7	49,120	$1,339,588
Mesaba SS Co.	Ohio	Nov 3, 1904	4	39,600	1,332,134
Acme SS Co.	West Virginia	Oct 12, 1903	3	30,000	761,169
Provident SS Co.	West Virginia	Nov 18, 1901	3	22,300	468,470
Interlake Co.	Ohio	May 1893	2	14,000	299,242
Huron Barge Co.	Ohio	Dec 28, 1891	2	9,900	203,610
Standard SS Co.	West Virginia	Oct 26, 1906	1	10,000	181,467
Total			22	174,920	4,585,680
(Issued for cash)					1,196,807
Gilchrist Trnpt Co.	Ohio	Jan 1897	17	120,300	
Grand total			39	295,220	5,782,487

Cash transactions
Item	Amount
17 Gilchrist ships	$2,362,669
Retired bonds principal	1,335,300
Bonds interest + call premium	58,830
Working capital	100,070
Initial insurance fund	250,000
Total	4,106,806

In 1916 13 ships (96,600 tons) were acquired from the Cleveland Steamship Company for a new total of 52 ships.

Interlake operated the second largest fleet on the Great Lakes in 1933 with 49 ships totaling 417,800 tons behind the Pittsburgh Steamship Company with 86 ships and 732,200 tons.

== Modern day operations ==
When Interlake launched its largest vessel in 1981, MV William J. Delancey (now MV Paul R. Tregurtha), its fleet contained 151 vessels, and was capable of carrying over three million tons of cargo at one time.

In early 2018, Interlake established a subsidiary service known as Interlake Logistics Solutions. Although its existing freight services were focused on bulk raw materials, the new service offered shipping of finished goods. The Barker and Tregurtha families, owners of Interlake Steamship, chartered the 418-foot (127 m), 14,000 short tons (13,000 t) barge Montville to provide this new service on an as-needed basis.

In April 2019, Interlake Steamship announced construction of a 639-foot (195 m) long, 75-foot (23 m) wide River-class self-unloading bulk freighter. The vessel, built by Fincantieri Bay Shipbuilding in Sturgeon Bay, Wisconsin, was the first U.S.-flagged, Jones Act-compliant ship constructed on the Great Lakes since 1983. and the first constructed by Interlake since 1981. The ship was christened MV Mark W. Barker in Cleveland, Ohio on 1 September 2022.

In December 2020, SS Badger was acquired by the Interlake Steamship Company. The deal also included acquisition of the tug USS Undaunted (ATA-199) (renamed MT Undaunted), deck barge SS City of Midland 41 (renamed ATB Pere Marquette 41), and SS Badger sister ship SS Spartan, currently in long-term lay-up. This was a part of a larger sale of assets. The Middleburg Heights, Ohio-based Interlake Holding Company acquired the assets of Lake Michigan Car Ferry Company, based in Ludington, Michigan.

== Fleet of vessels ==
The Interlake Steamship Company Vessels
Image	Vessel Name	Commissioned	Decommissioned	Notes
	ATB Pere Marquette 41	1940	1988	Currently an articulated tug-barge united with the tug Undaunted; Constructed as SS City of Midland 41
	MV Lee A. Tregurtha	1942		Constructed as USS Chiwawa for the United States Navy, later renamed SS Walter A. Sterling and SS William Clay Ford (II)
	MT Undaunted	1944		Currently an Auxiliary Fleet Tug on the Great Lakes; Constructed as USS Undaunted (ATA-199)
	SS Spartan	1952	1979	Currently on long-term lay-up in Ludington, Michigan
	SS Badger	1952		The last, and largest, coal-fired, steam engine car-ferry constructed in the United States
	MV Kaye E. Barker	1952		Constructed as SS Edward B. Greene, later renamed SS Benson Ford (III)
	Dorothy Ann-Pathfinder Tug-Barge	1953		Constructed as SS J. L. Mauthe.; Later renamed Dorothy Ann-Pathfinder, an articulated tug-barge unit entered service after a conversion from the former straight-deck bulk carrier, Steamer J. L. Mauthe. The Z-drive tug Dorothy Ann began sailing with the barge Pathfinder in 1999
	SS John Sherwin	1958	2008	Currently on long-term lay-up at the Interlake Steamship Company Dock in DeTour, Michigan
	MV Herbert C. Jackson	1959		Has always sailed for the Interlake Steamship Company; Constructed at Great Lakes Engineering Works at the same time of the SS Edmund Fitzgerald
	MV Honorable James L. Oberstar	1959		Constructed as SS Shenango II, later renamed SS Charles M. Beeghly
	MV Stewart J. Cort	1972		First 1000-foot vessel on the Great Lakes, the only 1000-foot vessel with pilothouse forward
	MV James R. Barker	1976		Third 1000-foot vessel on the upper Great Lakes
	MV Mesabi Miner	1977		Fourth 1000-foot vessel on the upper Great Lakes
	MV Paul R. Tregurtha	1981		Thirteenth 1000-foot vessel on the upper Great Lakes; Constructed as MV William J. Delancey; Flagship for the Interlake Steamship Company; Longest ship ever to operate on Great Lakes; Queen of the Lakes since 1981
	MG Winfield Scott (LT-805)	1993	2021	Currently on long-term lay-up in Ludington, Michigan
	MV Mark W. Barker	2022		The first Great Lakes bulk carrier that was constructed on the Great Lakes in more than 35 years; The first ship on the Great Lakes with engines that meet EPA Tier 4 emissions standards; First Jones Act-compliant vessel on Great Lakes in four decades

== 1913 Merger ==
The new stock issued in exchange for the old companies' stocks was computed based on the average of (1) appraised value of each old company (2) earning power in 1912 of each old company. From this was subtracted outstanding debt of each company (totaling $1,335,300) which was assumed by the new company and retired in 1913. In other words, the par value of common stock was valued equal to cash at the time of the merger. The 17 ships of the Gilchrist Transportation Company were bought for $2,362,669 in cash. An insurance fund was created and funded with an initial cash deposit of $250,000. Self-insurance becoming viable with a large enough number of ships was an explicit motive for the merger. The cash required was obtained by the sale of $3 million in bonds at 97 and the sale at par of $1,196,807 in stock. The Lackawanna Steamship Company as the surviving company was renamed to Interlake Steamship Company. Pickands, Mather & Co had the controlling interest.

Company	Incorporated	Date	Ships	Tons	Consideration (common stock par value)
Lackawanna SS Co.	Ohio	Oct 14, 1906	7	49,120	$1,339,588
Mesaba SS Co.	Ohio	Nov 3, 1904	4	39,600	1,332,134
Acme SS Co.	West Virginia	Oct 12, 1903	3	30,000	761,169
Provident SS Co.	West Virginia	Nov 18, 1901	3	22,300	468,470
Interlake Co.	Ohio	May 1893	2	14,000	299,242
Huron Barge Co.	Ohio	Dec 28, 1891	2	9,900	203,610
Standard SS Co.	West Virginia	Oct 26, 1906	1	10,000	181,467
Total			22	174,920	4,585,680
(Issued for cash)					1,196,807
Gilchrist Trnpt Co.	Ohio	Jan 1897	17	120,300	
Grand total			39	295,220	5,782,487

Cash transactions
Item	Amount
17 Gilchrist ships	$2,362,669
Retired bonds principal	1,335,300
Bonds interest + call premium	58,830
Working capital	100,070
Initial insurance fund	250,000
Total	4,106,806
