= James Barker (Royal Navy officer) =

British Royal Navy captain (1772–1838)

James Barker (1772–1838) was a captain in the Royal Navy.

Barker was the son of James Barker, a shipowner at Rotherhithe. He was born on 2 March 1772, and was entered on the books of the Beaver sloop, as early as 13 June 1780. He afterwards, whilst still a child, was on board the Prudent in the West Indies, and was present in the engagement at St. Kitts 25 and 26 January 1782. In 1794 he was serving on board the Russell, of 74 guns, and in her shared in the glories of 1 June. He was then transferred to the Jupiter, carrying the broad pennant of Commodore J. W. Payne; and in the following spring was in the royal yacht, on the occasion of bringing over the Princess Caroline of Brunswick, a service that gained for him promotion to the rank of lieutenant, 13 April 1795. He was afterwards appointed to the Orion, with Captain Sir James Saumarez, and, continuing in her, had a part in the victories of L'Orient, Cape St. Vincent, and the Nile; the last engagement gave him commander's rank on 8 Oct. 1798. Later he commanded the hired ship Moriston in the Bristol Channel and on the coast of Cornwall, and was made post-captain on 12 Aug. 1812.

He had no further employment in the navy, but settled down in the neighbourhood of Bristol, where he died 4 May 1838.
