= SS William Clay Ford =

American Great Lakes Bulk Carrier

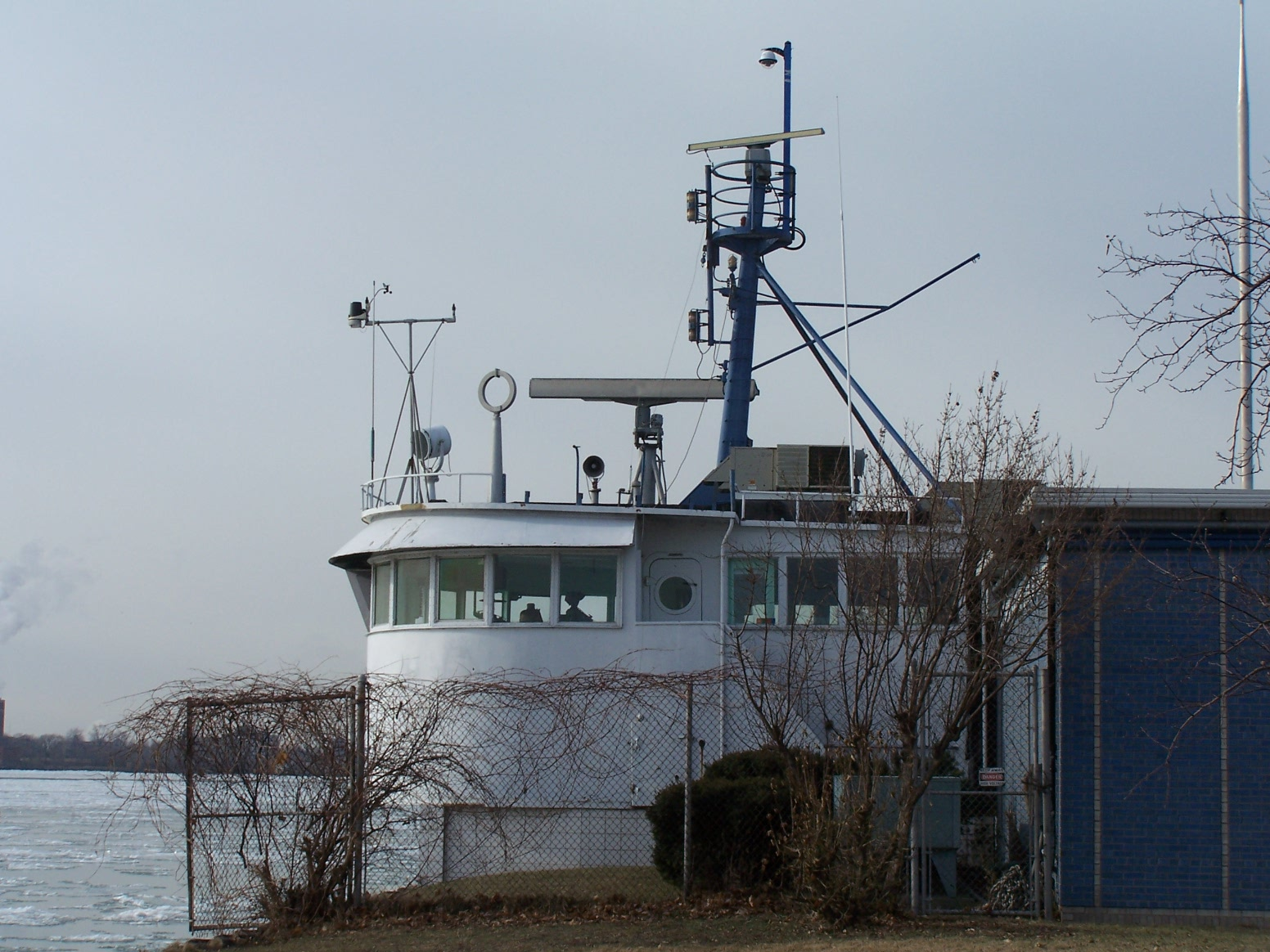
- The pilothouse from SS William Clay Ford on display at Belle Isle, Michigan.

History

United States
- Name: William Clay Ford (1953–1985); US 266029 (1985–1987)
- Namesake: William Clay Ford Sr.
- Owner: Ford Motor Company (1953–1984); Rouge Steel Corporation (1984–1987)
- Port of registry: Detroit, Michigan
- Builder: Great Lakes Engineering Works
- Yard number: 300
- Laid down: 10 April 1952
- Launched: 5 May 1953
- Identification: USCG ID: 266029; IMO number: 5390412
- Fate: Scrapped 1987

General characteristics
- Type: Lake freighter
- Tonnage: 11,590 GRT 8,590 NRT 20,300 DWT (1953–1979); 14,630 GRT 11,629 NRT (1979–)
- Length: 647 ft (197 m) LOA 629 ft 3 in (191.80 m) LBP (1953–1979); 767 ft (234 m) LOA 749 ft 3 in (228.37 m) LBP (1979–1987)
- Beam: 70 ft (21 m)
- Depth: 36 ft (11 m)
- Installed power: 7,700 shp (5,700 kW) steam turbine
- Speed: Cruising 14 kn max 15.1 kn
- Capacity: 21,000 tons (1953–1979); 26,500 tons (1979–)
- Crew: Approx 20-24

SS William Clay Ford was a bulk freighter built for hauling material on the Great Lakes. She was named for William Clay Ford Sr., grandson of Henry Ford. Her keel was laid in 1952 at River Rouge, Michigan by the Great Lakes Engineering Works, and she was launched in 1953. The ship was a part of the Ford Motor Company fleet of ore carriers and made her home port at Ford's River Rouge Plant, south of Detroit, Michigan. The first captain of William Clay Ford was John Jameson Pearce of Dearborn, Michigan.

William Clay Ford was one of two ships involved in the initial search for the SS Edmund Fitzgerald, along with the SS Arthur M. Anderson on 10 November 1975. The Anderson and Ford had made it to safety at Whitefish Bay, but went back into the storm at the request of the United States Coast Guard to look for survivors of the Fitzgerald. Because of the bravery and valor demonstrated that night by Captain Don Erickson and his crew, they were presented with many accolades including a plaque bestowed upon them by the Great Lakes Maritime Institute recognizing their role in the search for Edmund Fitzgerald. It reads:

On the night of November 10–11, 1975, these men voluntarily left a safe harbor to face the dangers of gale force winds and vicious seas, in the blackness of a storm which had already claimed as a victim the steamer Edmund Fitzgerald, to search for possible survivors of that disaster, exemplifying the finest traditions of the maritime profession.

In 1979 the hull of William Clay Ford was lengthened 120 feet.

In 1984, ownership was transferred to the Rouge Steel Corporation. In December 1984, she hauled her last load of cargo from Duluth, Minnesota, to Rouge Basin, south of Detroit.

In 1985 she was renamed US 266029, her registry number, as the USS Chiwawa was put into the fleet with the name William Clay Ford. The second William Clay Ford was later renamed again to MV Lee A. Tregurtha.

In August 1986, US 266029 was towed from her moorings to the Detroit Marine Terminal where the pilothouse was removed for display and exhibition, at the Dossin Great Lakes Museum on Detroit's Belle Isle. The hull was scrapped in Port Maitland, Ontario, in 1987.
