= Mesabi Miner =

Ship built in 1977

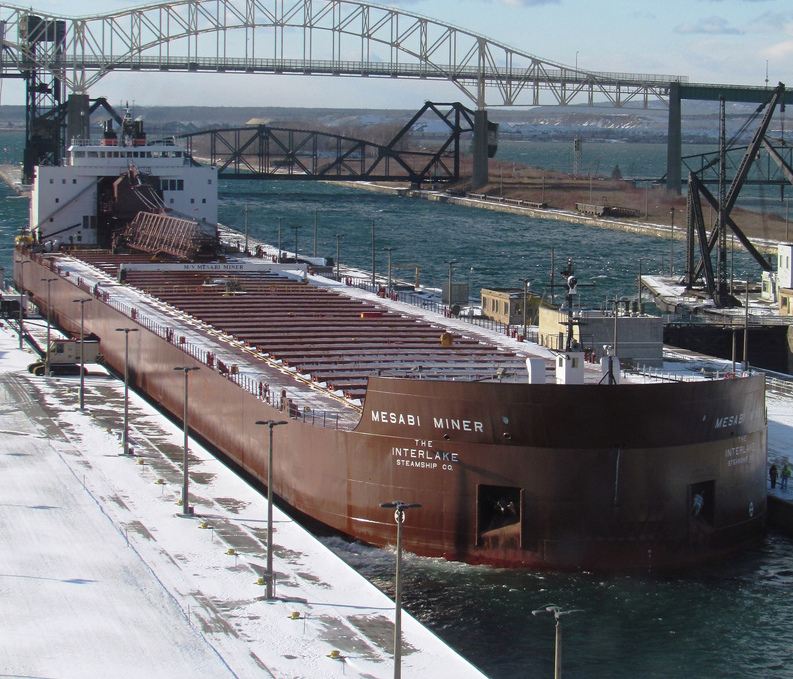
- MV Mesabi Miner transits Soo Locks in 2011

History

United States
- Name: MV Mesabi Miner
- Owner: Interlake Steamship Company
- Operator: Interlake Steamship Company
- Port of registry: Wilmington, Delaware
- Builder: American Ship Building Company
- Yard number: 906
- Laid down: 15 May 1975
- Launched: 14 February 1977
- Christened: 14 June 1977
- Maiden voyage: 7 June 1977
- Identification: Call sign: WYP8657; IMO number: 7390272; MMSI number: 366904880
- Status: In active service

General characteristics
- Class & type: Lake freighter
- Tonnage: 14,497 NRT; 34,729 GT
- Length: 1,003 ft (306 m)
- Beam: 105 ft (32 m)
- Depth: 50 ft (15 m)
- Installed power: 2 × MaK 6M43C four-stroke diesel engines, 8,160 HP (6 MW) each at 514 RPM
- Propulsion: 2 × 5.33 m (17.5 ft) controllable-pitch propeller; Bow thruster: 1,500 hp (1,100 kW)
- Speed: 15.5 knots (28.7 km/h; 17.8 mph)
- Capacity: Iron ore: 59,000 long tons (60,000 t); Coal: 63,300 long tons (64,300 t)

MV Mesabi Miner is a lake freighter that operates on the upper four North American Great Lakes. She is one of the small number of vessels that are too large to travel through the Welland Canal that connects Lake Erie to the lowest lake, Lake Ontario.

== History ==
The American Ship Building Company built the ship in 1975 at Lorain, Ohio. Like her sister ships, MV James R. Barker and MV Paul R. Tregurtha, she is owned and operated by the Interlake Shipping Company.

In spite of her size, the Mesabi Miner is able to maneuver, in harbor, without assistance from tugboats.

On the morning of January 5, 2014, USCGC Hollyhock was ice breaking for Mesabi Miner, about 22 nautical miles west of the Straits of Mackinac. She slowed after encountering harder ice and was struck in the stern by the much larger ore carrier. Both vessels sustained damage but there were no injuries, release of pollutants, or reports of flooding.
