= J. L. Mauthe =

1952 Great Lakes steamship

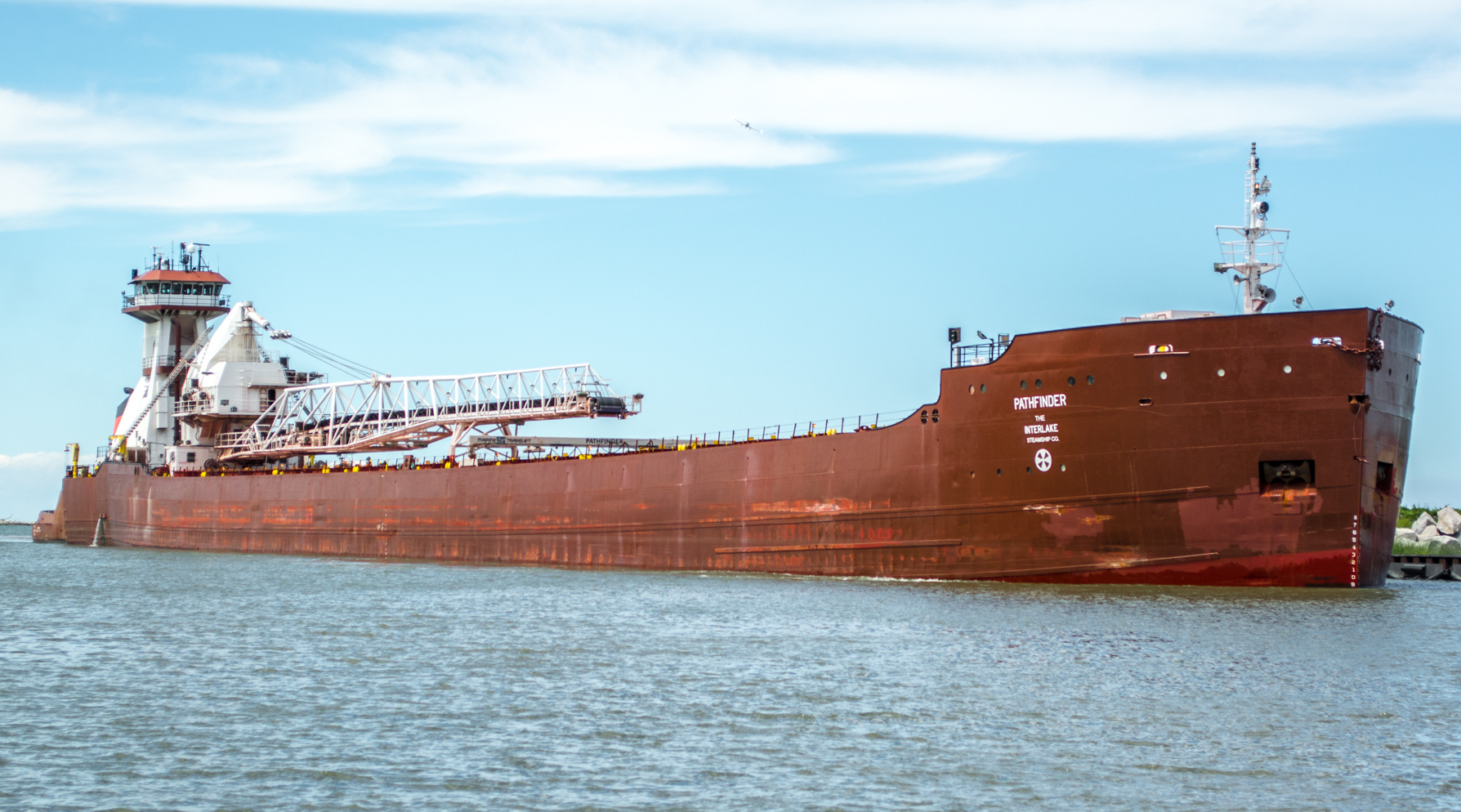
Dorothy Ann-Pathfinder Tug-Barge entering the Cuyahoga River in Cleveland, Ohio

The SS J.L. Mauthe, was originally a straight-deck bulk carrier steamship, hull #298, built in 1952 by the Great Lakes Engineering Works on the River Rouge, Michigan site and delivered to its owner, Interlake Steamship Company. The SS J.L. Mauthe operated as a self-propelled vessel for 46 years. Upon conversion into a barge, it was renamed as Pathfinder and is currently active on the lakes as an articulated tug-barge unit, paired with the Z-drive tug Dorothy Ann with a home port of Cleveland, Ohio.

== Operating History ==
=== Self-propelled ===
The SS J.L. Mauthe is one of the eight AAA class American ships, originally built with a length of 647 ft (197.2 m) in the 1950s. Seven of the eight AAA class vessels, including the J.L. Mauthe, are still operational today, making the AAA class one of the most successful designs on the Great Lakes.

By 1979, all the ships in the AAA class, except for the SS J.L. Mauthe and the SS William Clay Ford, had been converted into self unloaders, and by the early 1980s, the J.L. Mauthe was being used to transport large quantities of grain.

In 1992, SS J.L. Mauthe avoided a collision after the SS Cason J. Callaway cut in front of her to arrive at the Shell fuel dock first. Having sustained damage and wear through the progression of years, the vessel fell behind other AAA class ships and was put into layup in 1993.

=== Barge ===
In 1997-1998, the Interlake Steamship Company converted the SS J.L. Mauthe into a self-unloading barge, and renamed to the vessel SS Pathfinder in 1998.

Pathfinder was coupled with the pusher tug MT Joyce L. VanEnkevort from 1998 to 1999, until the Interlake Steamship Company built their new Z-drive tug, called the MT Dorothy Ann, which has sailed with Pathfinder as a tug-barge unit.
