= James R. Barker (academic) =

New Zealand academic

James R. Barker (1954 - 2023) was the Herbert S. Lamb Chair in Business Education at the Rowe School of Business, within the Faculty of Management at Dalhousie University, in Halifax, Nova Scotia.

His research focused on how internal behaviour affects an organization’s ability to improve and sustain safety, and safety-related knowledge; manage change; and innovate. Barker wrote for Management Communication Quarterly, where he was editor-in-chief from 2006–12. His recognition includes the 2010 Fredric M. Jablin Award for outstanding contributions to organizational communication; a 2014 Canadian Journal of Administrative Sciences award for best paper of the year; and a 2017 National Communication Association award for best book editing.

Barker taught at New Zealand’s University of Waikato Management School; Marquette University (a Catholic, Jesuit institution in Milwaukee, Wisconsin), the University of New Mexico, and the United States Air Force Academy, in Colorado Springs. Barker earned his BA from the University of Central Arkansas; his MA from Purdue University in West Lafayette, Indiana; and his PhD from the University of Colorado, in Boulder, Colorado.
