= USS Chiwawa =

Oiler of the United States Navy

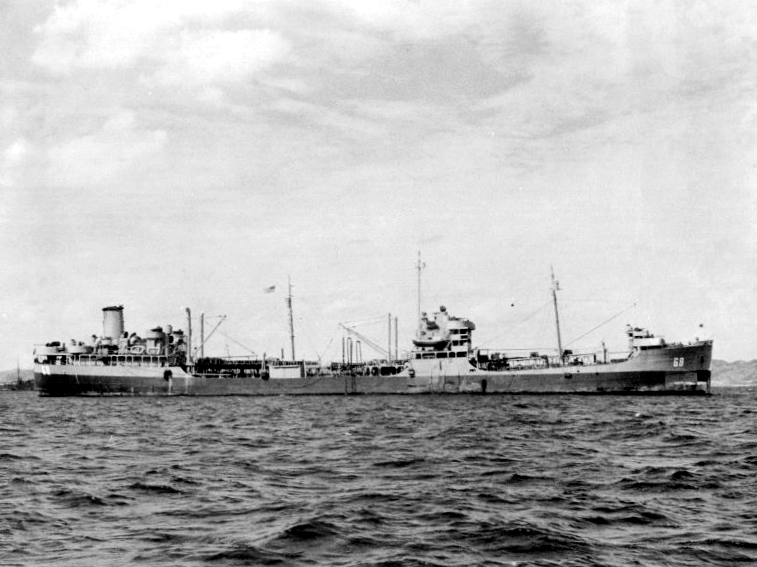
- USS Chiwawa at anchor off Okinawa on 7 September 1945

History

United States
- Name: USS Chiwawa
- Namesake: Chiwawa River in Washington
- Port of registry: Cleveland, Ohio
- Ordered: as T3-S-A1 tanker hull, MC hull 516
- Builder: Bethlehem Hingham Shipyard
- Laid down: as SS Samoset
- Launched: 25 June 1942
- Sponsored by: Mrs. H. G. Smith
- Commissioned: 24 December 1942
- Decommissioned: 6 May 1946
- Stricken: 25 September 1946
- Identification: IMO number: 5385625; MMSI number: 366904950; Callsign: WUR8857
- Honors and awards: Two battle stars for her World War II patrols
- Fate: Sold by the MARAD in 1961, currently in service as the MV Lee A. Tregurtha, a Great Lakes freighter for the Interlake Steamship Company

General characteristics
- Class & type: Chiwawa-class oiler
- Type: MARAD T3-S-A1
- Tonnage: 16,543 DWT
- Displacement: 21,077 tons
- Length: 501 ft 7.75 in (152.9017 m)
- Beam: 68 ft (21 m)
- Draft: 29 ft 10.5 in (9.106 m)
- Depth: 37 ft (11 m)
- Installed power: 7,000 shp (5,200 kW)
- Propulsion: geared steam turbine; single screw
- Speed: 15.3 knots (28.3 km/h)
- Range: 14,500 nmi (26,900 km; 16,700 mi)
- Capacity: 133,800 bbl (~18,250 t)
- Complement: 13 officers 200 enlisted
- Armament: one 5 in (130 mm) dual purpose gun mount, four 3 in (76 mm) guns, four twin 40 mm gun mounts, four twin 20 mm gun mounts

USS Chiwawa (AO-68) is a former T3-S-A1 Kennebec-class oiler constructed for the United States Navy during World War II. She was the only U.S. Navy ship named for the Chiwawa River in Washington.

Chiwawa was launched 25 June 1942 by Bethlehem Steel Co., Sparrows Point, Maryland, under a Maritime Commission contract as SS Samoset, sponsored by Mrs. H. G. Smith, acquired by the Navy 24 December 1942 and commissioned the same day, reporting to the Atlantic Fleet.

Chiwawa was designated a T3-S-A1 design, where "T" stood for tanker, "3" meant longer than 500 feet (150 m), "S" stood for single-screw steam propulsion, and "A1" meant first design of its kind.

== History ==
=== Military service ===
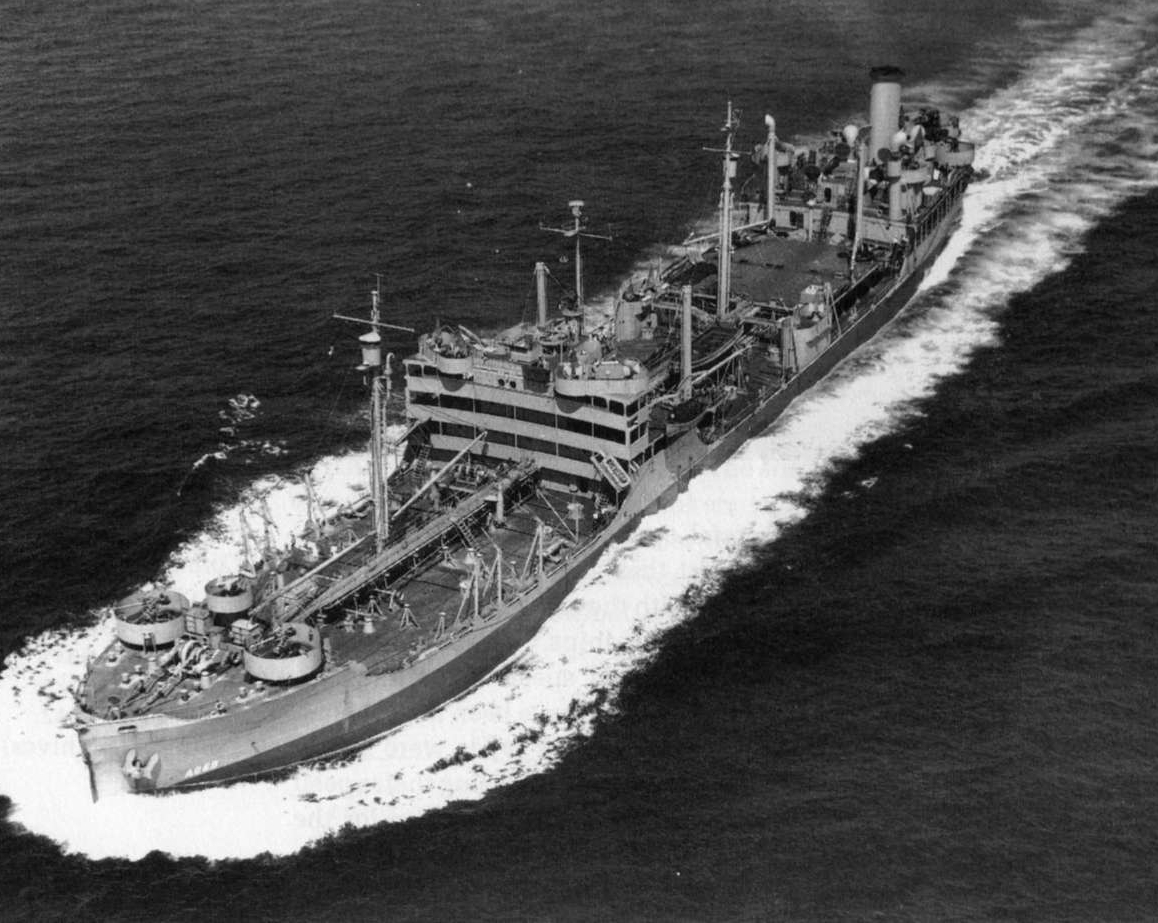
Aerial view of USS Chiwawa (AO-68), c. 1943

Chiwawa cleared Norfolk, Virginia, on 13 February 1943 to load oil at Aruba, and returned to New York City on 25 February to join a convoy for Casablanca, Morocco, which sailed on 4 March. Attacked by a wolfpack east of the Azores, the convoy lost four ships, but aircraft from Port Lyautey, Morocco, drove the U-boats away, and the remainder of the convoy arrived safely on 21 March. Chiwawa put out of Casablanca in convoy on 11 April for Norfolk, arriving on 28 April after a quiet passage. Between 4 May and 17 July, she ferried oil on the East Coast, loading at Aruba, Netherlands West Indies, and Port Arthur, Texas, and discharging her cargo at Bermuda, Argentia, Newfoundland, and Norfolk. She made three convoy crossings, to Scotland, Wales, and Casablanca, between 17 July and 4 December, then resumed operations to Port Arthur and Aruba, except for the period 25 January-8 March 1944, when she again crossed to North Africa.

After two convoy crossings to the British Isles in May and July 1944, Chiwawa sailed 14 July from Norfolk for Mers el Kebir, Algeria, and Naples, Italy, arriving on 5 August. From Naples, Chiwawa fueled the ships carrying out the invasion of southern France until she retired to Oran, Algeria, on 2 September. She returned to New York City on 14 September to resume coastal oil runs until her next convoy to Casablanca in November.

A series of runs between Aruba and New York City, then to Guantánamo Bay and Bermuda, and later to Argentia occupied Chiwawa until 31 May 1945, when she entered Norfolk Navy Yard for overhaul until 1 July. She cleared Norfolk to load oil at Baytown, Texas, and on 1 August, she reached Pearl Harbor. Five days later, she sailed for Ulithi and Okinawa, where from 30 August to 29 November, she served as station tanker, making one voyage in September to fuel the U.S. 7th Fleet at sea. Homeward bound, Chiwawa put in at San Francisco, California, and Balboa, arriving at New York City on 7 January 1946.

She sailed on 19 January 1946 from Melville, Rhode Island, for ports in England, Germany, and France, called at Casco Bay and Argentia, and put back to Iceland before her arrival in New York City on 18 March. Chiwawa was decommissioned on 6 May 1946 and transferred to the Maritime Commission on 23 August 1946 and was laid up in the National Defense Reserve Fleet, where she remained until 1961, when she was sold by the Maritime Administration.

=== Civilian service ===
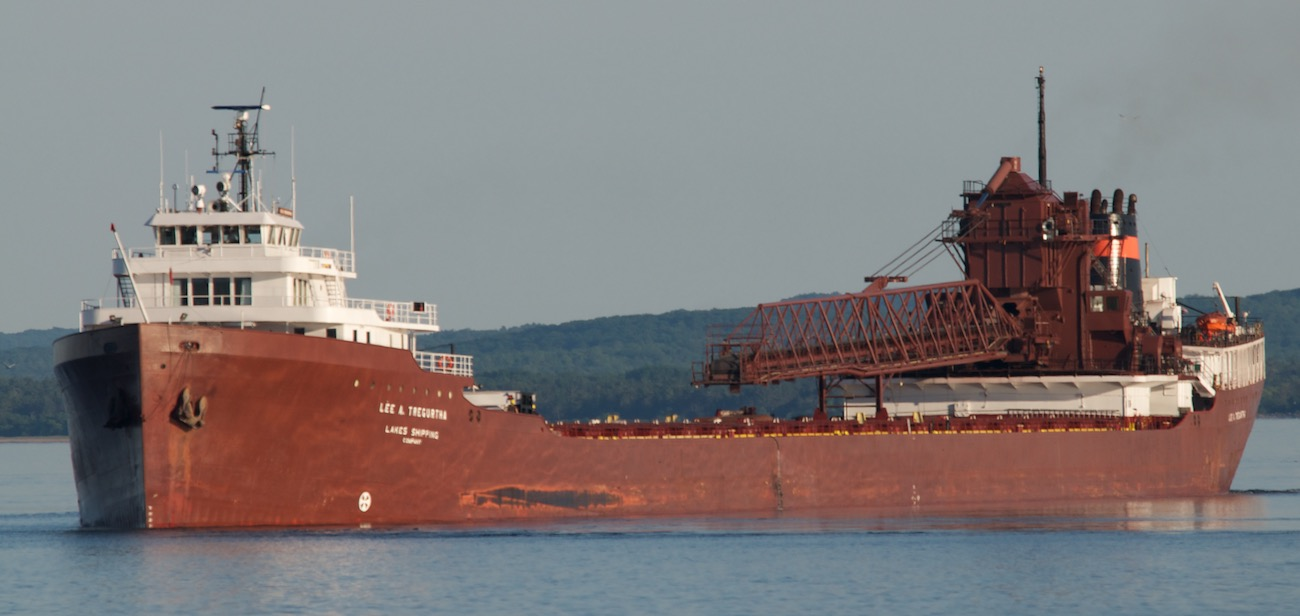
MV Lee A. Tregurtha leaving the upper harbor at Marquette, Michigan, after loading iron ore

She was then rebuilt as a straight-decked bulk freighter for Great Lakes service, at American Shipbuilding, Lorain, Ohio, renamed SS Walter A. Sterling sailing for the Cleveland Cliffs Steamship Company, and launched on 15 July 1961. That conversion included the integration of a 510 ft (155 m) midbody cargo section constructed in Germany and towed across the Atlantic Ocean. She was sold in 1985 to Ford Motor Company, renamed SS William Clay Ford (II). In 1989, she was sold again, this time to Lakes Shipping Co. and renamed SS Lee A. Tregurtha. Now owned by Interlake Steamship Company, MV Lee A. Tregurtha had her steam turbine replaced with two 3000 kW (4050 hp) Rolls-Royce Bergen B32:40-L6A diesel engines during the 2005-2006 lay-up. Throughout the summer of 2020, she was docked at Fraser Shipyards in Superior, Wisconsin, due to the downturn of shipping demand caused by the COVID-19 pandemic. She rejoined the lakes fleet in March 2021 and is currently active.

As a civilian vessel, MV Lee A. Tregurtha has a crew of 21, comprising seven officers and 14 crew, compared to the Chiwawa's wartime complement of about 225 officers and enlisted men.

== Awards and honors ==
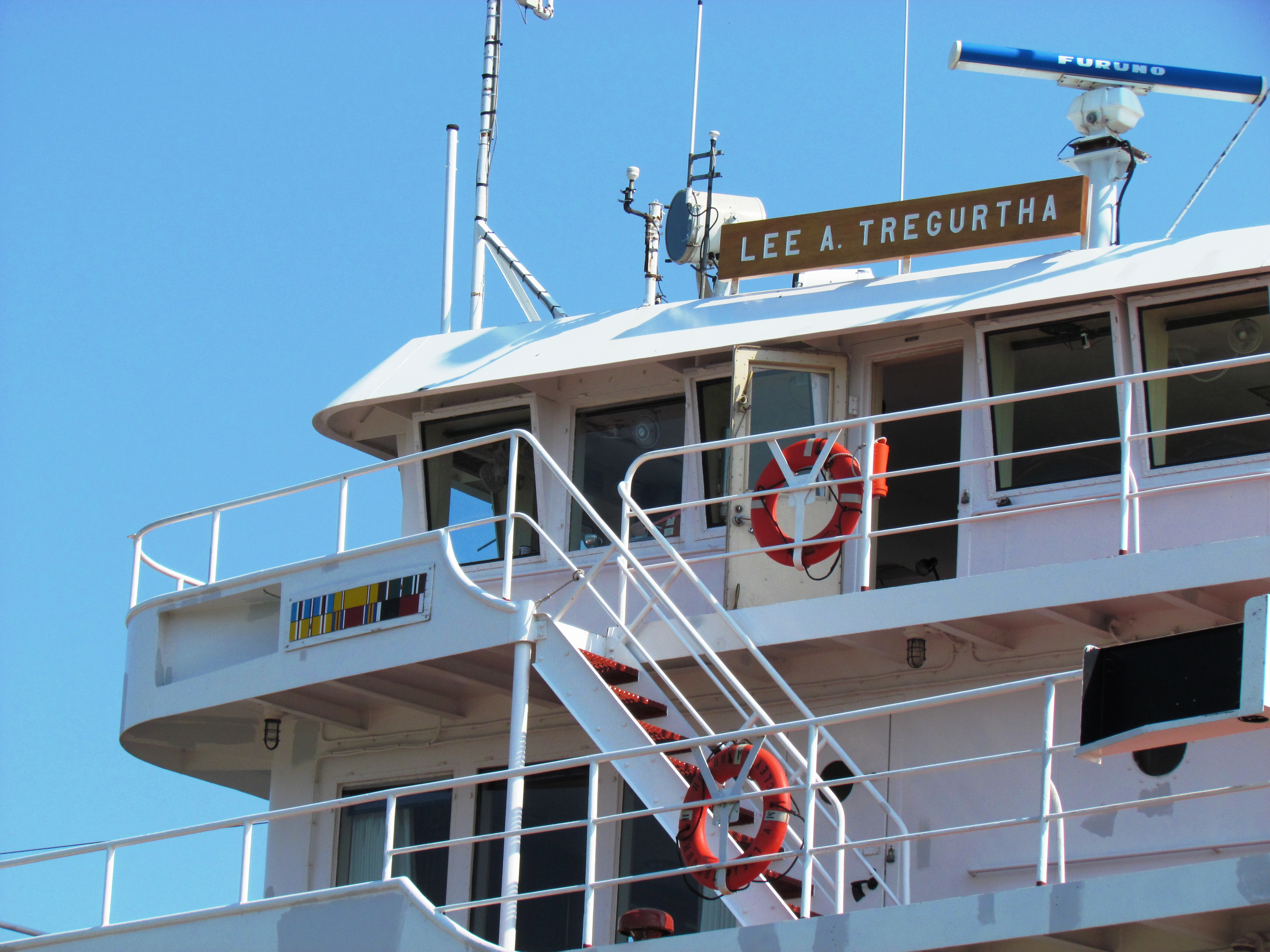
World War II campaign ribbons on the pilothouse of the MV Lee A. Tregurtha

Chiwawa received two battle stars for World War II service.

She was authorized:

American Campaign Medal
European-African-Middle Eastern Campaign Medal (Two)	Asiatic-Pacific Campaign Medal	World War II Victory Medal	Navy Occupation Service Medal (with Asia clasp)
