= James R. Barker (businessman) =

American shipping businessman

- Education: Columbia University (BA); Harvard Business School (MBA)
- Occupations: Chairman of Interlake Steamship Company and SeaStreak
- Known for: Co-founder of Temple, Barker & Sloane; CEO of Moore-McCormack

James R. Barker is an American shipping businessman who is the chairman of the Interlake Steamship Company and SeaStreak. He was also a management consultant who co-founded Temple, Barker & Sloane, which formed the global consulting firm Oliver Wyman. He is the namesake of the lake freighter MV James R. Barker.

== Biography ==
Barker grew up spending summers with his uncle, a boat captain in Sault Ste. Marie, Michigan, and worked on ships doing the Great Lakes trade. Barker graduated from Columbia College in 1957 and became a coast guard officer. He then graduated from Harvard Business School, and worked for Pickands Mather & Co., a raw materials production and shipping company.

Barker later joined Harbridge House, a consulting firm as a transportation scientist. In January 1970, he formed shipping consultancy Temple, Barker & Sloane with Carl Sloane and Peter Temple and was hired by Moore-McCormack to tackle its business problems. In 1971, he became chairman and CEO of Moore-McCormack, becoming then the youngest CEO of a major American corporation at 35 years old. In 1973, he led the purchase of the Pickands Mather Group. Barker served in his chief executive role until 1988, when he acquired the company's cargo shipping operations.

He has served as chairman of the Interlake Steamship Company since he acquired the subsidiary from McCormack in 1987. He served as a director of Verizon and its predecessor, GTE from 1976 to 2007. He was also a former Chairman of the National Maritime Council and a director of the American Bureau of Shipping.

== Recognition ==
Barker received the Lone Sailor Award from The United States Navy Memorial in 2022.
