= MV Paul R. Tregurtha =

Bulk freighter built 1981

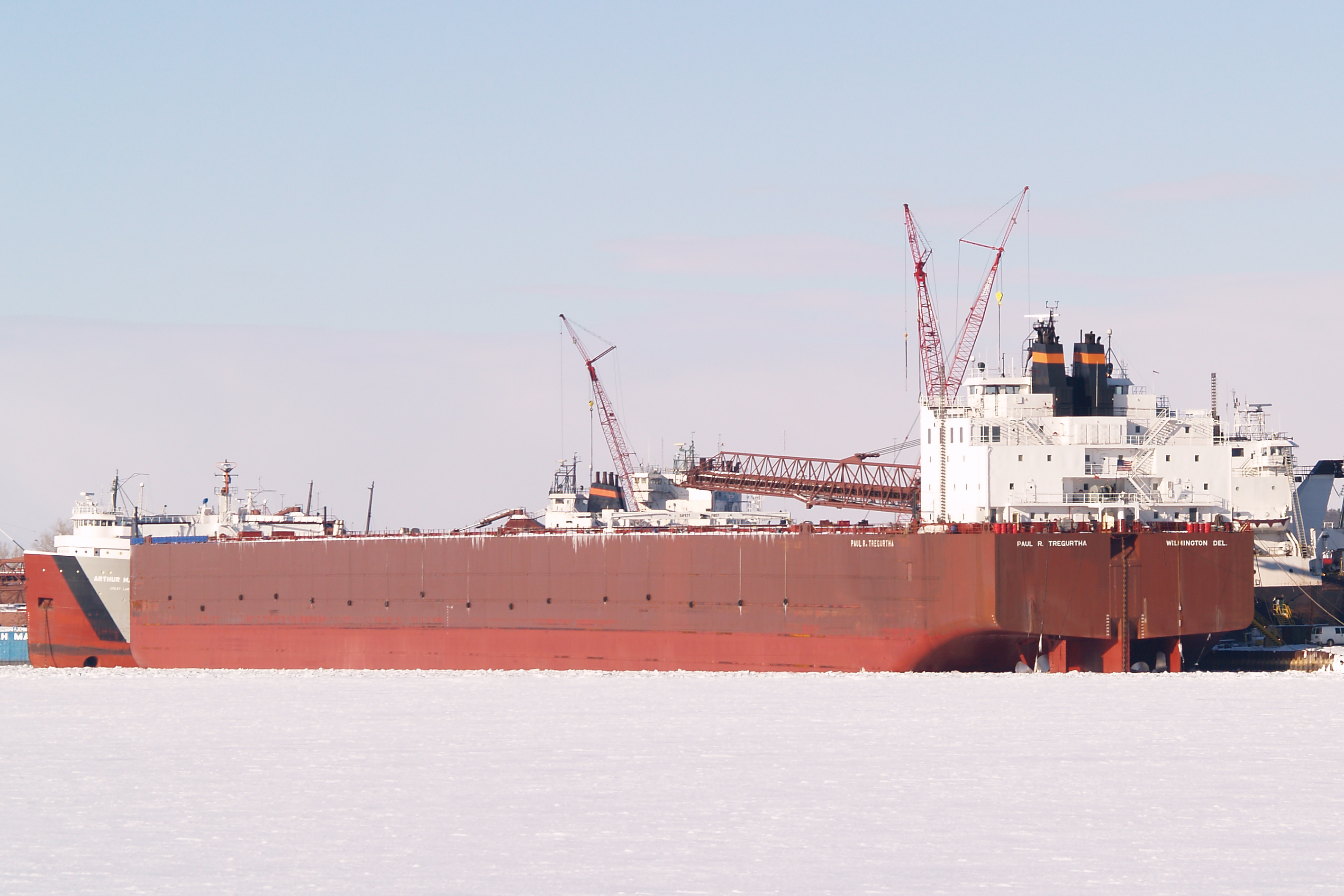
- MV Paul R. Tregurtha laid up over the winter in Sturgeon Bay, Wisconsin.

History

United States
- Name: MV Paul R. Tregurtha
- Owner: Interlake Steamship Company
- Operator: Interlake Steamship Company
- Port of registry: Wilmington, Delaware
- Builder: American Ship Building Company
- Yard number: 909
- Laid down: 12 July 1979
- Launched: 4 February 1981
- Christened: 25 April 1981
- Maiden voyage: 10 May 1981
- Identification: Call sign: WYR4481; IMO number: 7729057; MMSI number: 366904940
- Nickname(s): "The Big Paul", "Fancy De Lancey"
- Status: In active service

General characteristics
- Class & type: Lake freighter
- Tonnage: 14,497 net register tonnage; 36,360 GT
- Length: 1,013.5 ft (308.9 m)
- Beam: 105 ft (32 m)
- Depth: 56 ft (17 m)
- Installed power: 2 × MaK 6M43C four-stroke diesel engines, 8,160 HP (6 MW) each at 514 RPM
- Propulsion: 2 × 5.33 m (17.5 ft) controllable-pitch propeller; Bow thruster: 1,500 hp (1,100 kW)
- Speed: 15.5 knots (28.7 km/h; 17.8 mph)
- Capacity: Iron ore: 68,000 long tons (69,000 t); Coal: 63,616 long tons (64,637 t)

MV Paul R. Tregurtha is a Great Lakes-based bulk carrier freighter. She is the current Queen of the Lakes, an unofficial but widely recognized title given to the longest vessel active on the Great Lakes. Launched as MV William J. De Lancey, she was the last of the thirteen "thousand footers" to enter service on the Great Lakes, and was also the last Great Lakes vessel built at the American Ship Building Company yard in Lorain, Ohio. The MV Paul R. Tregurtha is the current flagship for the Interlake Steamship Company.

== Construction ==
The Interlake Steamship Company was given a contract in 1979, by its customer Republic Steel, to transport iron ore from Lake Superior ports to their steel mill at Indiana Harbor, or to their trans-shipment terminal at Lorain.

Designed by the American Ship Building Company to fulfill two briefs:

- Bulk carrier
- Executive passenger transportation

With the second brief in mind, she was one of the first freighters with full air conditioning, elevators, and luxurious décor. Built in two parts, her keel was laid down on July 12, 1979, at the American Ship Building Company yard in Toledo, Ohio. On completion, the forward section was towed to their yard in Lorain, Ohio where it was mated with the stern portion. The completed hull No. 909 has a total length of 1,013 feet (309 m).

Stephens-Adamson designed a loop belt elevator system, that feeds a stern mounted 260-foot (79 m) discharge boom that can be swung 100 degrees to port or starboard. Capable of unloading at a rate of 10,000 long tons of iron ore per hour, or 6,000 net tons of coal per hour, the total system displaces 14,497 tons.

Formally launched on February 4, 1981, the vessel was christened on April 25, 1981, as MV William J. De Lancey, named in honor of Republic Steel's chairman who participated in the launch. In 1990 she received her current name. Paul R. Tregurtha, born 1935, was the Vice Chairman of Interlake Steamship Company's Board.

== Operations ==
MV William J. De Lancey departed Lorain on her maiden voyage on May 10, 1981, sailing in ballast to Silver Bay, Minnesota, to load 55,944 long tons (56,842 t) of iron ore pellets. She arrived back in Lorain on May 16, 1981. She holds a number of cargo records:

- August 7, 1982: 63,007 long tons (64,018 t) load at Escanaba, Michigan, for Indiana Harbor
- July 20, 1983: broke the Lorain port record delivering 61,846 long tons (62,838 t) of iron ore pellets from Escanaba. She then established a lower lakes record by loading 50,239 long tons (51,045 t) net tons of coal from Ashtabula to Consumers Power, becoming the largest cargo loaded on the lower Great Lakes.
- First 71 cargoes totaled 4,151,398 long tons (4,218,015 t), averaging 58,450 long tons (59,390 t) per load, restricted due to the lower draft in Lorain (less draft) and Escanaba to Indiana Harbor
- Holds lower lakes record of 50,239 net tons of coal, shipped from Ashtabula, Ohio, to Consumers Power
- 2001 season: Carried the most cargo through the Soo Locks at 3,004,957 long tons (3,053,177 t)

On termination of the Republic Steel contract, on May 23, 1990, she was rechristened MV Paul R. Tregurtha at Sturgeon Bay, Wisconsin, named in honor of the Vice Chairman of Interlake Steamship Co. On May 3, 2002, her only captain, Captain Mitch Hallin, died in his cabin, aged 55.

In winter 2004, she was asked to transport a reserve of coal to Algoma Steel in Sault Ste. Marie, Ontario, necessitating a mid-winter voyage. Loading 43,000 net tons in Conneaut, Ohio, both United States and Canadian Coast Guard services provided ice breaking assistance so that the voyage was completed without any delays. After unloading on January 29, she departed for her normal winter lay-up in Sturgeon Bay, Wisconsin.

She was the subject of a television program in the first season of Discovery Channel Canada's series Mighty Ships. That program recounts how in 2008, while leaving Sturgeon Bay, Wisconsin, MV Paul R. Tregurtha got stuck in ice and cracked steel plating on the port side of her bow, causing ballast tank water to leak out. Framing beneath the plating was also bent and cracked. After undergoing repairs at the Fraser Shipyards in Superior, Wisconsin, she then loaded her coal cargo at the dock and carried it to Detroit, Michigan.

== 2012 and 2014 grounding incidents ==
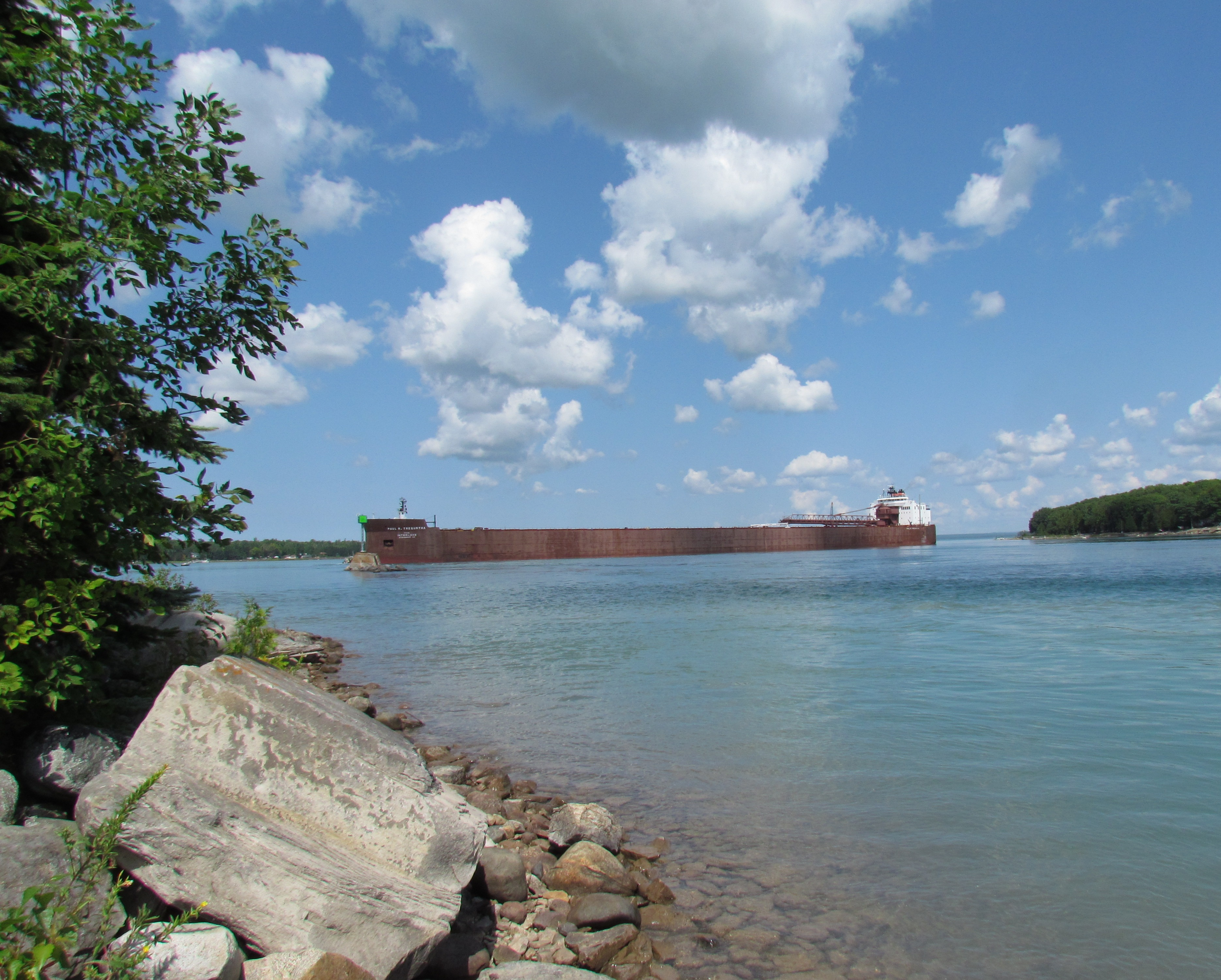
MV Paul R. Tregurtha aground in the outbound channel of the St. Marys River, August 15, 2012

At around 3 a.m. on August 15, 2012, as she was proceeding downbound with 62,000 tons of coal, the bow of MV Paul R. Tregurtha grounded in the outbound channel of St. Marys River, just north of the Neebish Island ferry crossing, near Sault Ste. Marie. Her stern then pivoted and grounded on the opposite side of the channel, completely blocking the approach to the Rock Cut in the Lower St. Marys River. With assistance from the U.S. Coast Guard, at 5:30 a.m. on August 19, two tugs with a combined 4,000 horsepower (3,000 kW) moved the stern of the ship into the middle of the channel. This enabled salvage experts to successfully raise the ship's bow by filling stern voids which reduced the amount of forward weight on the rocks, and hence refloat the vessel.

During the afternoon of September 20, 2014, she was involved in an incident in Duluth, Minnesota, when she ran aground just off the Bayfront Festival Park in the Duluth Harbor Basin, just west of the Aerial Lift Bridge.
