= James R. Barker (1976 ship) =

Ship built in 1976

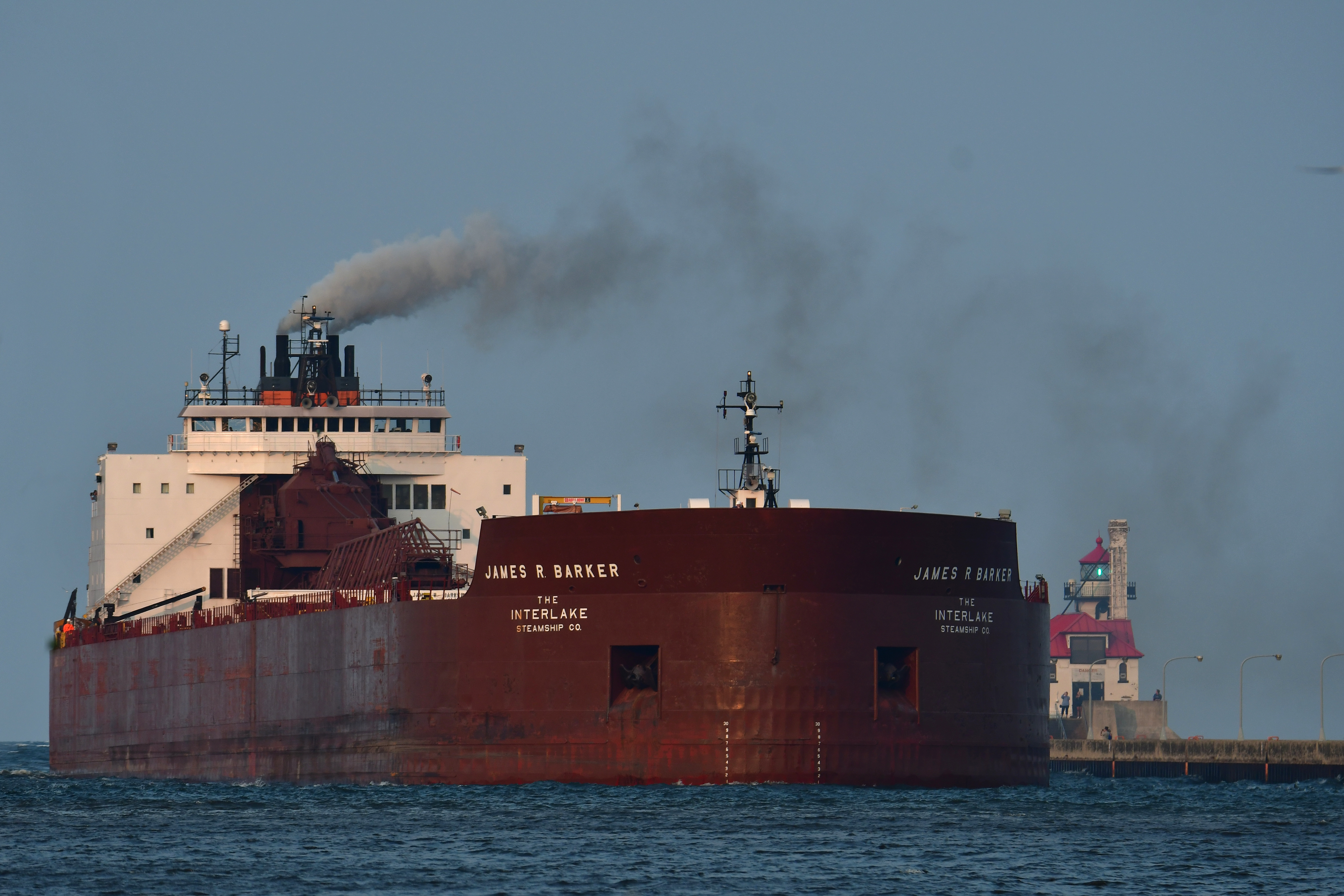
- MV James R. Barker entering the Duluth harbor on August 17, 2018.

History

United States
- Name: MV James R. Barker
- Owner: Interlake Steamship Company
- Operator: Interlake Steamship Company
- Port of registry: Wilmington, Delaware
- Builder: American Ship Building Company
- Yard number: 905
- Laid down: 14 October 1974
- Launched: 29 May 1976
- Christened: 7 August 1976
- Identification: Call sign: WYP8657; IMO number: 7390260; MMSI number: 366905890
- Status: In active service

General characteristics
- Class & type: Lake freighter
- Tonnage: 14,497 net register tonnage; 36,360 GT
- Length: 1,004 ft (306 m)
- Beam: 105 ft (32 m)
- Depth: 50 ft (15 m)
- Installed power: 2 × Pielstick 16PC2-2V-400 V16 diesels
- Propulsion: 2 × 5.33 m (17.5 ft) controllable-pitch propeller; Bow thruster: 1,500 hp (1,100 kW)
- Speed: 15.5 knots (28.7 km/h; 17.8 mph)
- Capacity: Iron ore: 59,000 long tons (60,000 t); Coal: 63,300 long tons (64,300 t)

MV James R. Barker is an American bulk carrier that operates on the upper four North American Great Lakes. Built in 1976 by the American Ship Building Company at Lorain, Ohio, the ship is 1,004 feet (306 m) long, 50 feet (15 m) high and 105 feet (32 m) wide. Like the MV Mesabi Miner, a ship of the same design, she is owned and operated by the Interlake Steamship Company and was named for Interlake’s Chairman of the Board, James R. Barker.

The MV James R. Barker is the third vessel of that size to be built. There are fourteen vessels that are restricted to the upper lakes because they are too large to travel through the Welland Canal that connects Lake Erie to the lowest lake, Lake Ontario.

In spite of their size, these two vessels are able to maneuver in harbor without requiring assistance from tugboats.

She is well known for her signature and unique two-tone "Barker Bark", when sounding her klaxon coming into and out of ports such as Duluth, Minnesota and Sault Ste Marie, Michigan.
