= USAV MG Winfield Scott =

Ship owned by the U.S. army

MG Winfield Scott (LT-805)
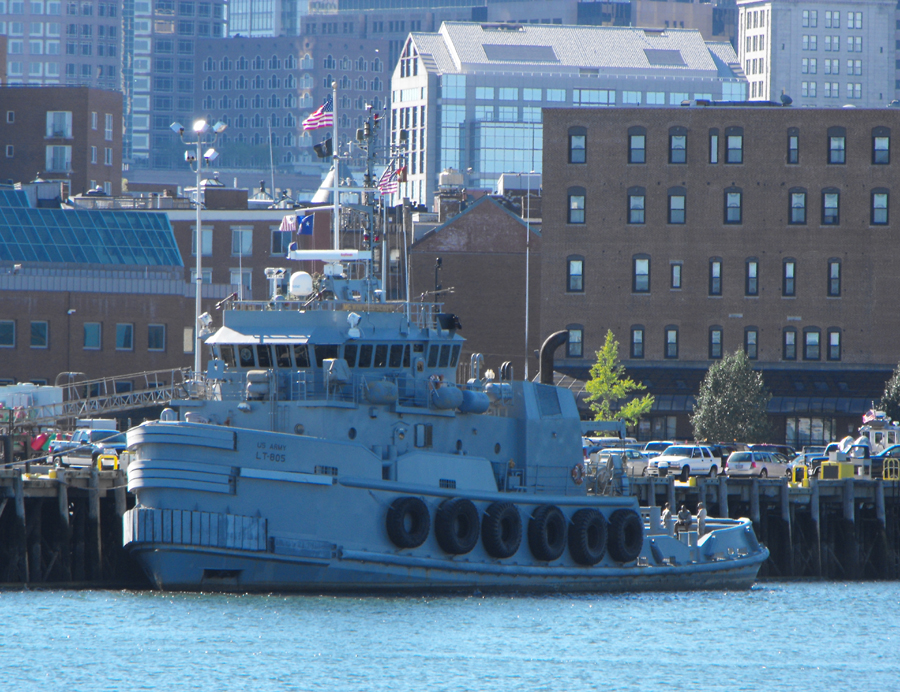
- MG Winfield Scott (LT-805)

History

United States
- Namesake: Winfield Scott
- Owner: Interlake Maritime Services
- Operator: United States Army
- Port of registry: Ludington, Michigan
- Builder: Moss Point Marine (now VT Halter Marine), Escatawpa, Mississippi
- Acquired: 29 October 1993
- Identification: MMSI number: 368705000; Callsign: ADTJ
- Fate: Sold civilian October 2021 to Interlake Maritime Services for service from Ludington, Michigan in long-term lay-up

General characteristics
- Class & type: LT (large tug)
- Type: tugboat
- Displacement: 924 tons
- Length: 128 feet (39 m)
- Beam: 36 feet (11 m)
- Draft: 14.5 ft (4.4 m) (light); 17 ft (5.2 m) (loaded)
- Propulsion: Two diesel engines, 2,550 bhp
- Speed: 13.5 knots (25.0 km/h; 15.5 mph)
- Range: 5,000 nmi (9,300 km; 5,800 mi) at 13.5 knots (25.0 km/h; 15.5 mph) (light); 5,000 nmi (9,300 km; 5,800 mi) at 12 knots (22 km/h; 14 mph) (loaded)
- Capacity: Bollard Pull is 58 tons
- Complement: 23

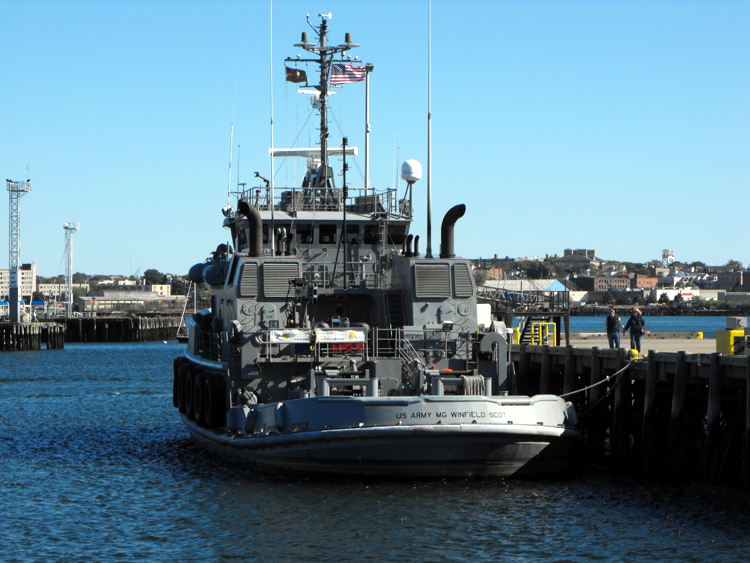
MG Winfield Scott (LT-805) at Boston in 2010

The United States Army tugboat MG Winfield Scott (LT-805) was built by Moss Point Marine, Escatawpa, Mississippi, and delivered to the U.S. Army on 29 October 1993. She is named for Major General Winfield Scott.

In October 2021 the MG Winfield Scott was sold at auction to Interlake Maritime Services and brought to Ludington, Michigan, arriving on November 29, 2021.

Interlake Logistic Solutions is the parent company of Lake Michigan Carferry Service, operator of the SS Badger, and of Pere Marquette Shipping, operator of the barge Pere Marquette 41 (ex-SS City of Midland 41) and tug MT Undaunted (ex-USS Undaunted (ATA-199)). All are based in Ludington. Lake Michigan Carferry also owns the SS Spartan, which is in long-term layup at Ludington.
