= Interlake Maritime Services =

Great lakes maritime service

- Industry: Shipping, Transportation
- Predecessor: Interlake Steamship Company
- Founded: December 2020
- Headquarters: Cleveland, Ohio, United States
- Area served: Great Lakes (North America)
- Divisions: Interlake Steamship Company; Lake Michigan Carferry Service; Interlake Logistics Solutions; Interlake Port Services
- Website: interlake-steamship.com

Interlake Maritime Services is an American shipping firm that was created in December 2020 after Interlake Steamship Company purchased the assets of Pere Marquette Shipping Company and Lake Michigan Car Ferry Company, including the car ferry SS Badger, MT Undaunted, ATB Pere Marquette 41, SS Spartan, and MG Winfield Scott (LT-805). Its corporate headquarters is located in Middleburg Heights, a suburb of Cleveland, Ohio, with additional regional offices in Duluth, Minnesota, and Ludington, Michigan.

== Subsidiaries ==
Interlake Maritime Services owns the following companies:

- Interlake Logistics Services - this division formerly operated a chartered cargo ship Montville
- Interlake Logistics Solutions
- Interlake Port Services
- Interlake Steamship Company
- Lake Michigan Carferry Service
- Original Soo Locks Boat Tours
