= MGen. Nathanael Greene-class tugboat =

MGen. Nathanael Greene class
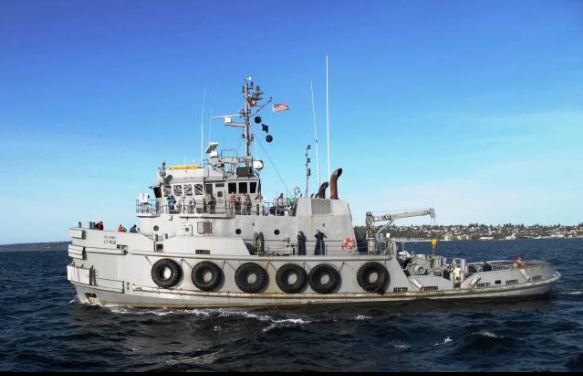
- USAV MG Henry Knox (LT-802) assigned to the 467th Transportation Company in Tacoma, Washington.

Class overview
- Builders: Robert E. Derecktor Shipyard (LT-801–LT-803); VT Halter Marine, Inc.
- Operators: United States Army
- In commission: 1994–present
- Planned: 13
- Completed: 6
- Canceled: 7
- Active: 6

General characteristics
- Type: Large tug
- Displacement: 924 long tons (939 t)
- Length: 128 ft (39 m)
- Beam: 36 ft (11 m)
- Draft: 16 ft (4.9 m)
- Propulsion: 2 diesels, 2 shafts, 2,550 bhp (1,900 kW)
- Speed: 12 knots (22 km/h; 14 mph)
- Complement: 24

The MGen. Nathanael Greene-class large coastal tugs are powered watercraft in the United States Army. They are a class of large tugs built for US Army service, primarily intended to assist in docking of transports.

== Ships ==
- USAV MGen Nathanael Greene (LT-801) (Auctioned off)
- USAV MGen Henry Knox (LT-802)
- USAV MGen Anthony Wayne (LT-803)
- USAV BGen Zebulon Pike (LT-804)
- USAV MG Winfield Scott (LT-805)
- USAV COL Seth Warner (LT-806)
- USAV SgM John Champe (LT-807) (planned, never built)
- USAV MGen Jacob Brown (LT-808) (planned, never built)
