= Winfield Scott =

United States Army general (1786–1866)

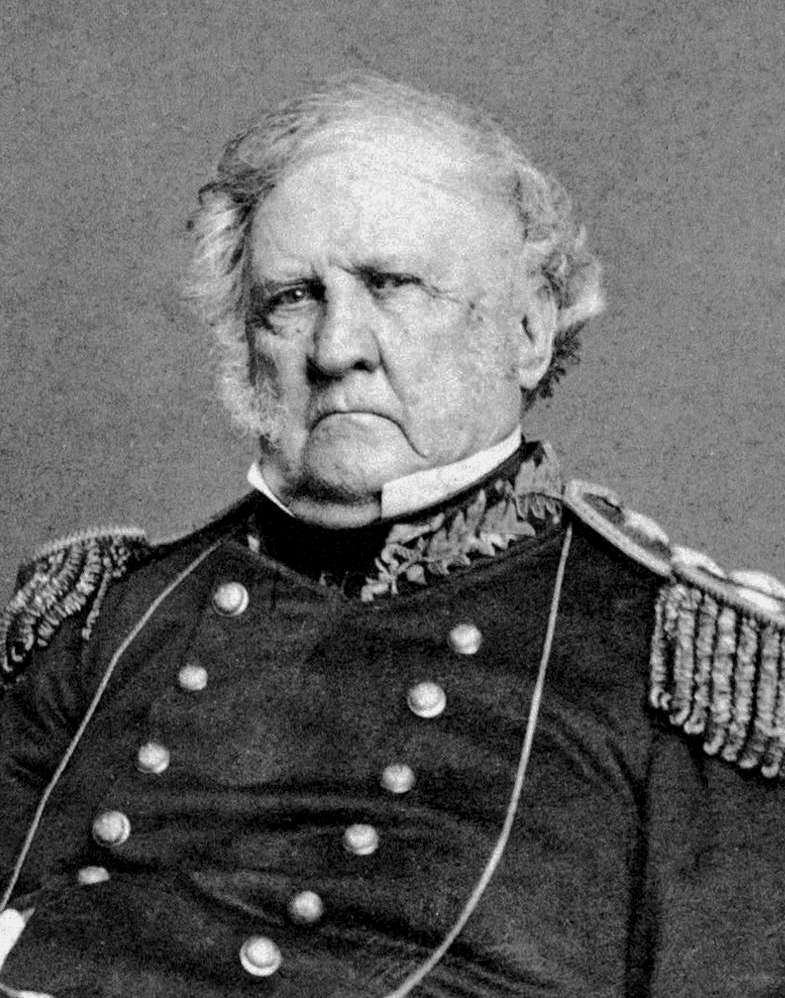
- Scott in uniform, c. 1862

Commanding General of the U.S. Army
- In office July 5, 1841 – November 1, 1861
- President: John Tyler; James K. Polk; Zachary Taylor; Millard Fillmore; Franklin Pierce; James Buchanan; Abraham Lincoln
- Preceded by: Alexander Macomb
- Succeeded by: George B. McClellan

Personal details
- Born: June 13, 1786 Dinwiddie County, Virginia, U.S.
- Died: May 29, 1866 (aged 79) West Point, New York, U.S.
- Resting place: West Point Cemetery in West Point, New York, U.S.
- Party: Whig
- Spouse: Maria DeHart Mayo (m. 1817; died 1862)
- Education: College of William & Mary (attended)
- Awards: Congressional Gold Medal (2)
- Nicknames: "Old Fuss and Feathers"; "The Grand Old Man of the Army"

Military service
- Branch/service: Virginia Militia; Union Army; United States Army
- Years of service: 1807 (Militia); 1808–1861 (U.S. Army)
- Rank: Brevet Lieutenant General
- Commands: 1st Brigade, Left Division, Army of the North; Division of the North; Eastern Department; Eastern Division; Commanding General of the United States Army; Army of Mexico
- Battles/wars: See battles: Chesapeake–Leopard affair; War of 1812; Battle of Queenston Heights; Battle of Fort George; Battle of Point Iroquois; Battle of Hoople's Creek; Capture of Fort Erie; Battle of Chippawa; Battle of Lundy's Lane; American Indian Wars; Black Hawk War; Creek War of 1836; Second Seminole War; Patriot War; Aroostook War; Mexican–American War; Siege of Veracruz; Battle of Cerro Gordo; Battle of Contreras; Battle of Churubusco; Battle for Mexico City; Pig War; American Civil War

Winfield Scott (June 13, 1786 – May 29, 1866) was an American military commander and a presidential candidate. He served as Commanding General of the United States Army from 1841 to 1861, and was a veteran of the War of 1812, American Indian Wars, Mexican–American War, and the early stages of the American Civil War. Scott was the Whig Party's presidential nominee in the 1852 election but was defeated by Democrat Franklin Pierce. He was known as Old Fuss and Feathers for his insistence on proper military etiquette and the Grand Old Man of the Army for his many years of service.

Scott was born near Petersburg, Virginia, in 1786. After training as a lawyer and brief militia service, he joined the army in 1808 as a captain of the light artillery. In the War of 1812, Scott served on the Canadian front, taking part in the Battle of Queenston Heights and the Battle of Fort George, and was promoted to brigadier general in early 1814. He served with distinction in the Battle of Chippawa but was badly wounded in the subsequent Battle of Lundy's Lane. After the conclusion of the war, Scott was assigned to command army forces in a district containing much of the Northeastern United States, and he and his family made their home near New York City. During the 1830s, Scott negotiated an end to the Black Hawk War, took part in the Second Seminole War and the Creek War of 1836, and presided over the forced removal of the Cherokee. Scott also helped to avert war with the United Kingdom, defusing tensions arising from the Patriot War and the Aroostook War.

In 1841, Scott became the Commanding General of the United States Army, beating out his rival Edmund P. Gaines for the position. After the outbreak of the Mexican–American War in 1846, Scott was relegated to an administrative role, but in 1847 he led a campaign against the Mexican capital of Mexico City. After capturing the port city of Veracruz, he defeated Mexican General Antonio López de Santa Anna's armies at the Battles of Cerro Gordo, Contreras, and Churubusco. He then captured Mexico City, after which he maintained order in the Mexican capital and indirectly helped envoy Nicholas Trist negotiate the Treaty of Guadalupe Hidalgo, which brought an end to the war.

Scott unsuccessfully sought the Whig presidential nomination three times, in 1840, 1844, and 1848. He won it in 1852, when the party was in danger of dying off. The Whigs were severely divided over the Compromise of 1850, and Democrat Franklin Pierce won a decisive victory over his former commander. Nonetheless, Scott remained popular among the public. In 1855, he received a brevet promotion to lieutenant general, becoming the first U.S. Army officer to hold that rank since George Washington. In 1859, he peacefully solved the Pig War in Washington Territory, ending the last in a long series of British-American border conflicts. Despite being a Virginia native, Scott stayed loyal to the Union when the Civil War broke out and served as an essential adviser to President Abraham Lincoln during the opening stages of the war. He developed a strategy known as the Anaconda Plan but retired in late 1861 after Lincoln increasingly relied on General George B. McClellan for military advice and leadership. In retirement, he lived in West Point, New York, where he died on May 29, 1866.

Contemporaries highly regarded Scott's military talent, and historians generally consider him one of the most accomplished generals in U.S. history.

== Early life ==
Scott used this coat of arms for his bookplate. It has been incorporated into the heraldry of various units of the U.S. Army, including the 1st and 7th Engineer Battalions.

Scott was born on June 13, 1786, the fifth child of Ann (Mason) Scott and William Scott, a planter, veteran of the American Revolutionary War, and officer in the Dinwiddie County militia. At the time, the Scott family resided at Laurel Hill, a plantation near Petersburg, Virginia. Ann Mason Scott was the daughter of Daniel Mason and Elizabeth Winfield, and Scott's parents chose his maternal grandmother's surname for his first name. Scott's paternal grandfather, James Scott, had migrated from Scotland after the defeat of Charles Edward Stuart's forces in the Battle of Culloden. Scott's father died when Scott was six years old; his mother did not remarry. She raised Scott, his older brother James, and their sisters Mary, Rebecca, Elizabeth, and Martha until her death in 1803. Although Scott's family held considerable wealth, most of the family fortune went to James, who inherited the plantation. At six feet, five inches tall and 230 pounds, with a hardy constitution, in his prime Scott was a physically large and imposing figure.

Scott's education included attendance at schools run by James Hargrave and James Ogilvie. In 1805, Scott began attending the College of William & Mary, but he soon left to study law in the office of attorney David Robinson. His contemporaries in Robinson's office included Thomas Ruffin. While apprenticing under Robinson, Scott attended the trial of Aaron Burr, who had been accused of treason for his role in events now known as the Burr conspiracy. During the trial, Scott developed a negative opinion of the Senior Officer of the United States Army, General James Wilkinson, as the result of Wilkinson's efforts to minimize his complicity in Burr's actions by providing forged evidence and false, self-serving testimony.

Scott was admitted to the bar in 1806, and practiced in Dinwiddie. In 1807, Scott gained his initial military experience as a corporal of cavalry in the Virginia Militia, serving amid the Chesapeake–Leopard affair. Scott led a detachment that arrested eight British sailors who had attempted to land to purchase provisions. Virginia authorities did not approve of this action, fearing it might spark a wider conflict, and they soon ordered the release of the sailors. Later that year, Scott attempted to establish a legal practice in South Carolina but was unable to obtain a law license because he did not meet the state's one-year residency requirement.

== Early career, 1807–1815 ==
=== First years in the army ===
In early 1808, President Thomas Jefferson asked Congress to authorize an expansion of the United States Army after the British government issued the Orders in Council, which affected American trade with Europe. Scott convinced U.S. Senator William Branch Giles, a family friend, to help him obtain a commission in the newly expanded army. In May 1808, shortly before his twenty-second birthday, Scott was commissioned as a captain in the light artillery. Tasked with recruiting a company, he raised his troops from the Petersburg and Richmond areas, then traveled with his unit to New Orleans to join their regiment. Scott was deeply disturbed by what he viewed as the unprofessionalism of the army, which at the time consisted of just 2,700 officers and men. He later wrote that "the old officers had, very generally, sunk into either sloth, ignorance, or habits of intemperate drinking."

He soon clashed with his commander, General James Wilkinson, over Wilkinson's refusal to follow the orders of Secretary of War William Eustis to remove troops from an unhealthy bivouac site. Wilkinson owned the site, and while the poor location caused several illnesses and deaths among his soldiers, Wilkinson refused to relocate them because he personally profited. In addition, staying near New Orleans enabled Wilkinson to pursue his private business interests and continue the courtship of Celestine Trudeau, whom he later married.

Scott briefly resigned his commission over his dissatisfaction with Wilkinson, but before his resignation had been accepted, he withdrew it and returned to the army. In January 1810, Scott was convicted in a court-martial, partly for making disrespectful comments about Wilkinson's integrity, and partly because of a $50 shortage in the $400 account he had been provided to conduct recruiting duty in Virginia after being commissioned. Concerning the money, the court-martial members concluded that Scott had not been intentionally dishonest but had failed to keep accurate records. His commission was suspended for one year. After the trial, Scott fought a duel with William Upshaw, an army medical officer and Wilkinson friend Scott blamed for initiating the court-martial. Each fired at the other, and Upshaw's bullet grazed the top of Scott's head, but both emerged unharmed.

After the duel, Scott returned to Virginia, where he spent the year studying military tactics and strategy, and practicing law in partnership with Benjamin Watkins Leigh. Meanwhile, Wilkinson was removed from command for insubordination and was succeeded by General Wade Hampton. The rousing reception Scott received from his army peers as he began his suspension led him to believe that most officers approved of his anti-Wilkinson comments, at least tacitly; their high opinion of him, coupled with Leigh's counsel to remain in the army, convinced Scott to resume his military career once his suspension had been served. He rejoined the army in Baton Rouge, where one of his first duties was to serve as a judge advocate (prosecutor) in the court-martial of Colonel Thomas Humphrey Cushing.

=== War of 1812 ===
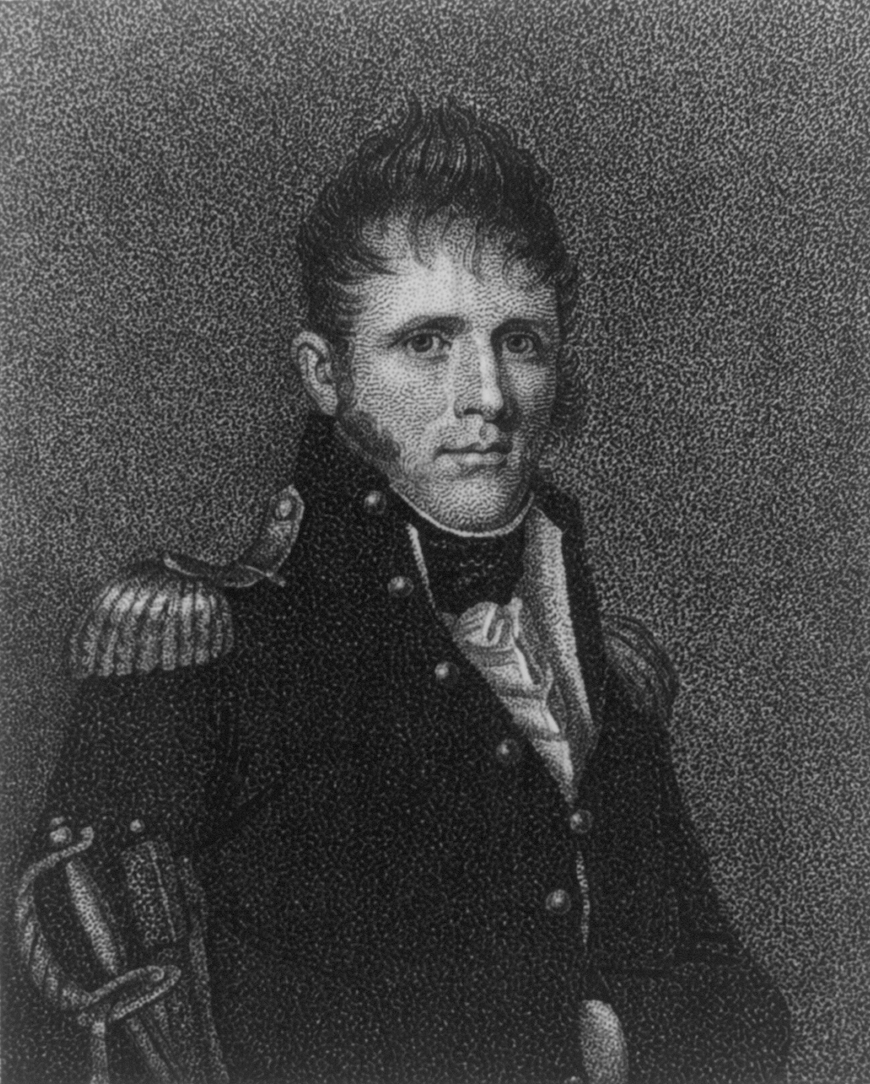
Print of Major General Scott by David Edwin, 1814

Map showing the northern theater of the War of 1812

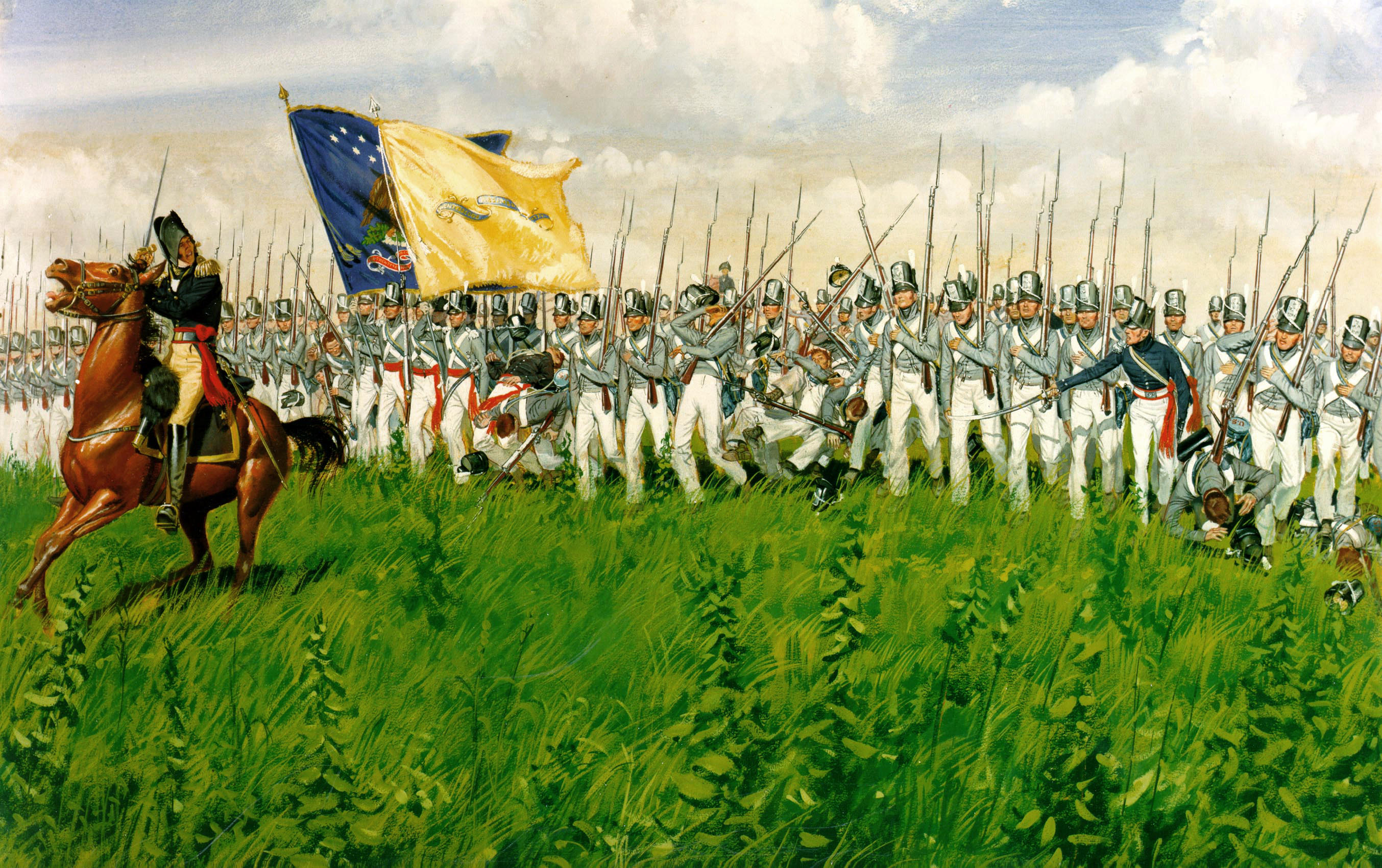
Battle of Chippawa

In July 1812, the U.S. Congress declared war on Britain after years of deteriorating relations resulting from a variety of issues. After war was declared, Scott was promoted to the rank of lieutenant colonel and assigned as second-in-command of the 2nd Artillery Regiment, serving under George Izard. While Izard continued to lead recruitment efforts, Scott led two companies north to join General Stephen Van Rensselaer's militia force, which was preparing for an invasion of the Canadas. President James Madison made the invasion the central part of his administration's war strategy in 1812, as he sought to capture Montreal and thereby take control of the St. Lawrence River and cut off Upper Canada from Lower Canada. The invasion would begin with an attack on the town of Queenston, which was just across the Niagara River from Lewiston, New York.

In October 1812, Van Rensselaer's force attacked a British force in the Battle of Queenston Heights. Scott led an artillery bombardment that supported an American crossing of the Niagara River, and he took overall command of U.S. forces at Queenston Heights after Colonel Solomon Van Rensselaer was badly wounded. Shortly after Scott took command, a British column under Roger Hale Sheaffe arrived. Sheaffe's numerically superior force compelled an American retreat, ultimately forcing Scott to surrender to the British after reinforcements from the militia failed to materialize. As a prisoner of war, Scott was treated hospitably by the British, although two Mohawk chiefs nearly killed him while he was in British custody. As part of a prisoner exchange, Scott was released in late November; upon his return to the United States, he was promoted to colonel and appointed to command the 2nd Artillery Regiment. He also became the chief of staff to Henry Dearborn, who was the senior general of the army and personally led operations against Canada in the area around Lake Ontario.

Dearborn assigned Scott to lead an attack against Fort George, which commanded a strategic position on the Niagara River. With help from United States Navy elements commanded by Isaac Chauncey and Oliver Hazard Perry, he led U.S. troops to land behind the fort, forcing its surrender. Scott was widely praised for his conduct in the battle, although he was personally disappointed that the bulk of the British garrison escaped capture. As part of another campaign to capture Montreal, Scott forced the British to withdraw from Hoople Creek in November 1813. Despite this success, the campaign fell apart after the American defeat at the Battle of Crysler's Farm and after Wilkinson (who had taken command of the front in August) and Hampton failed to cooperate on a strategy to take Montreal. With the failure of the campaign, President Madison and Secretary of War John Armstrong Jr. relieved Wilkinson (Note: Wilkinson was exonerated in a subsequent court-martial but was honorably discharged from the U.S. Army. He later published an autobiography that was strongly critical of Scott. In 1854, a French historian conclusively proved that Wilkinson had been an agent of the Spanish government while serving as governor of the Louisiana Territory.) and some other senior officers of their battlefield commands. They were replaced with younger officers such as Scott, Izard, and Jacob Brown. In early 1814, Scott was promoted to brigadier general (Note: Scott became the youngest general officer in the army at the time of his promotion.) and was assigned to lead a regiment under Brown.

In mid-1814, Scott took part in another invasion of Canada, which began with a crossing of the Niagara River under Brown's command. Scott was instrumental in the American success at the Battle of Chippawa, which took place on July 5, 1814. Though the battle was regarded as inconclusive from the strategic point of view because the British force remained intact after the battle, it was seen as a significant moral victory for the Americans, being "the first real success attained by American troops against British regulars."

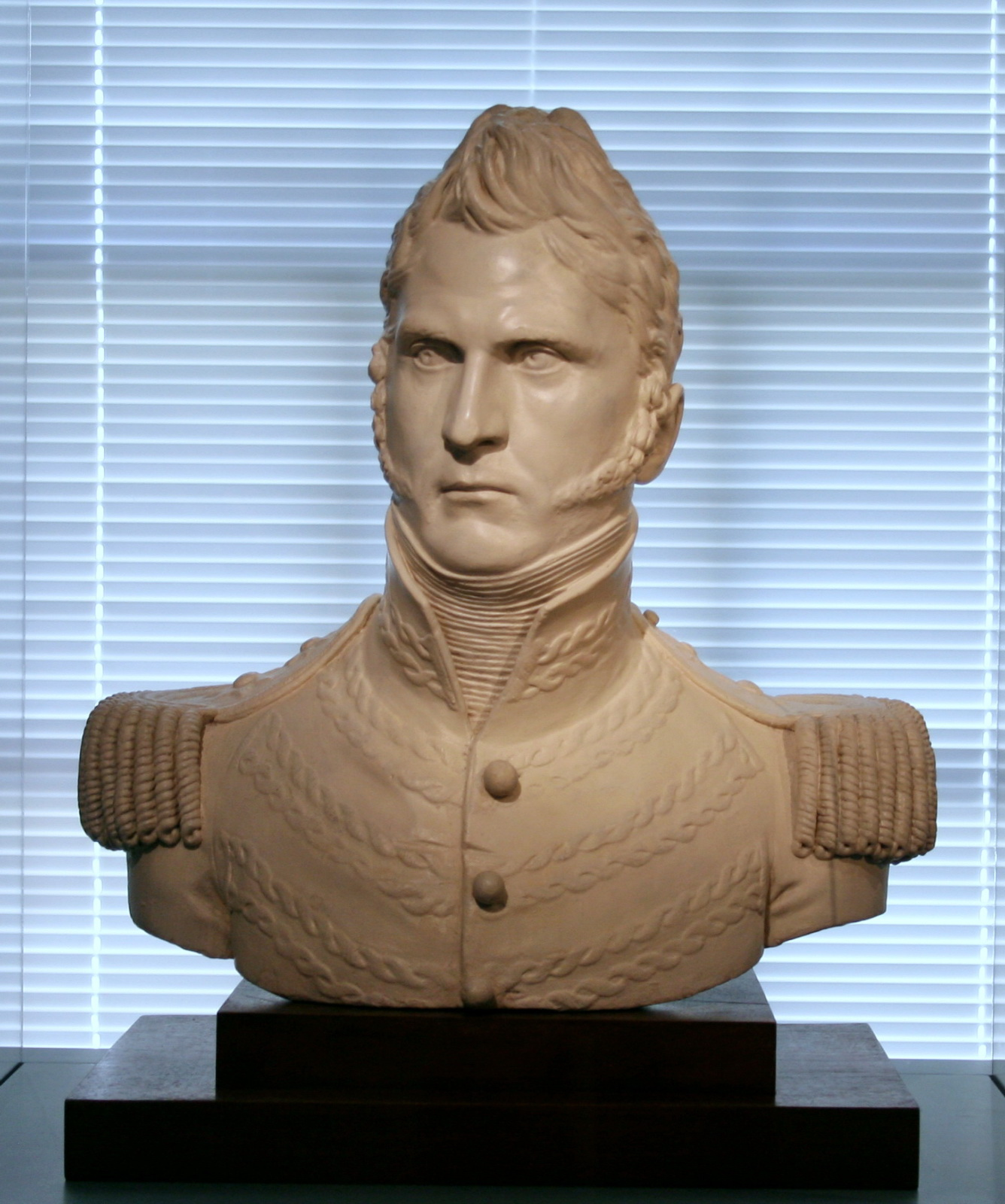
Bust of Scott by William Rush, c. 1814

Later, in July 1814, a scouting expedition led by Scott was ambushed, beginning the Battle of Lundy's Lane. Scott's brigade was decimated after British troops led by General Gordon Drummond arrived as reinforcements, and he was placed in the reserve in the second phase of the battle. Scott was later severely wounded while seeking a place to commit his reserve forces. He believed that Brown's decision to refrain from fully committing his strength at the outset of this battle resulted in the destruction of Scott's brigade and many unnecessary deaths. The battle ended inconclusively after Brown ordered his army to withdraw, effectively bringing an end to the invasion. Scott spent the following months convalescing under the supervision of military doctors and physician Philip Syng Physick.

Scott's performance at the Battle of Chippawa had earned him national recognition. He was promoted to the brevet rank of major general and awarded a Congressional Gold Medal. (Note: Scott was awarded a second Congressional Gold Medal for his service during the Mexican–American War.) In October 1814, Scott was appointed commander of American forces in Maryland and northern Virginia, taking command in the aftermath of the Burning of Washington. The War of 1812 came to an effective end in February 1815, after news of the signing of the Treaty of Ghent (which had been signed in December 1814) reached the United States.

In 1815, Scott was admitted to the Pennsylvania Society of the Cincinnati as an honorary member in recognition of his service in the War of 1812. Scott's Society of the Cincinnati insignia, made by silversmiths Thomas Fletcher and Sidney Gardiner of Philadelphia, was a one-of-a-kind, solid gold eagle measuring nearly three inches in height. It is one of the most unique military society insignias ever produced. There are no known portraits or photographs of Scott wearing the insignia, which is now in the collection of the United States Military Academy Museum.

== Family ==
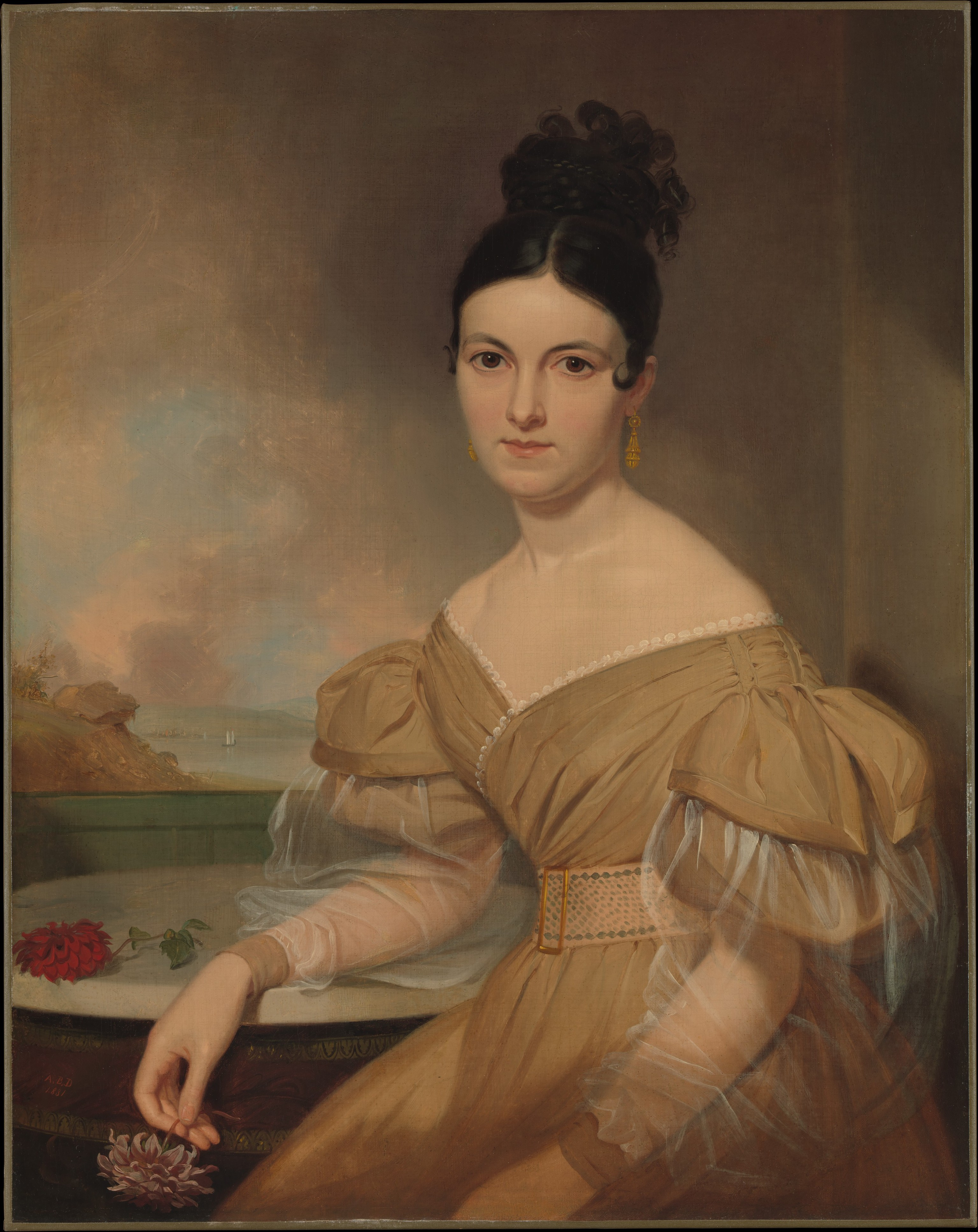
Maria DeHart Mayo (1789–1862), portrait by Asher Durand

In March 1817, Scott married Maria DeHart Mayo (1789–1862). She was the daughter of Abigail (née DeHart) Mayo and Colonel John Mayo, a wealthy engineer and businessman who came from a distinguished family in Virginia. Scott and his family lived in Elizabethtown, New Jersey for most of the next thirty years. Beginning in the late 1830s, Maria spent much of her time in Europe because of a bronchial condition, and she died in Rome in 1862. They were the parents of seven children, five daughters and two sons:

- Maria Mayo Scott (1818–1833), who died as a teenager.
- John Mayo Scott (1819–1820), died young
- Virginia Scott (1821–1845), became Sister Mary Emanuel of the Georgetown convent of Visitation nuns
- Edward Winfield Scott (1823–1827), died young
- Cornelia Winfield Scott (1825–1885), married Colonel Henry Lee Scott (1814–1886) (no relation), Winfield Scott's aide-de-camp and Inspector General of the Army
- Adeline Camilla Scott (1831–1882), married New York City businessman Goold Hoyt (1818–1883)
- Marcella Scott (1834–1909), married Charles Carroll MacTavish (1818–1868), grandson of Richard Caton and a member of Maryland's prominent Carroll family

== Mid-career, 1815–1841 ==
=== Post-war years ===
Following the conclusion of the War of 1812, Scott served on a board charged with demobilizing the army and determining who would continue to serve in the officer corps. Andrew Jackson and Brown were selected as the army's two major generals, while Alexander Macomb, Edmund P. Gaines, Scott, and Eleazer Wheelock Ripley would serve as the army's four brigadier generals. Jackson became commander of the army's Southern Division, Brown became commander of the army's Northern Division, and the brigadier generals were assigned leadership of departments within the divisions. Scott obtained a leave of absence to study warfare in Europe, though to his disappointment, he reached Europe only after Napoleon's final defeat at the Battle of Waterloo. Upon his return to the United States in May 1816, he was assigned to command army forces in parts of the Northeastern United States. He made his headquarters in New York City and became part of the city's social life. He earned the nickname "Old Fuss and Feathers" for his insistence on proper military bearing, courtesy, appearance, and discipline. In 1835, Scott wrote Infantry Tactics, Or, Rules for the Exercise and Maneuvre of the United States Infantry, a three-volume work that served as the standard drill manual for the United States Army until 1855.

Scott developed a rivalry with Jackson after Jackson took offense to a comment Scott had made at a private dinner in New York, though they later reconciled. He also continued a bitter feud with Gaines that centered over which of them had seniority, as both hoped to eventually succeed the ailing Brown. (Note: The dispute arose over whether regular or brevet promotions took priority. Gaines argued for regular commissions because Scott and Gaines were both officially promoted to colonel on March 12, 1813, and brigadier general on March 9, 1814. Gaines's name appeared before Scott's on those orders, making him senior to Scott. Scott argued for brevets because he received his brevet promotion to major general on July 25, 1814, three weeks earlier than Gaines's August 15 brevet, making Scott senior to Gaines.) In 1821, Congress reorganized the army, leaving Brown as the sole major general and Scott and Gaines as the only brigadier generals; Macomb accepted demotion to colonel and appointment as the chief of engineers, while Ripley and Jackson both left the army. After Brown died in 1828, President John Quincy Adams passed over Scott and Gaines due to their feuding, instead appointing Macomb. Scott was outraged and asked to be relieved of his commission, but ultimately backed down.

=== Black Hawk War and Nullification Crisis ===
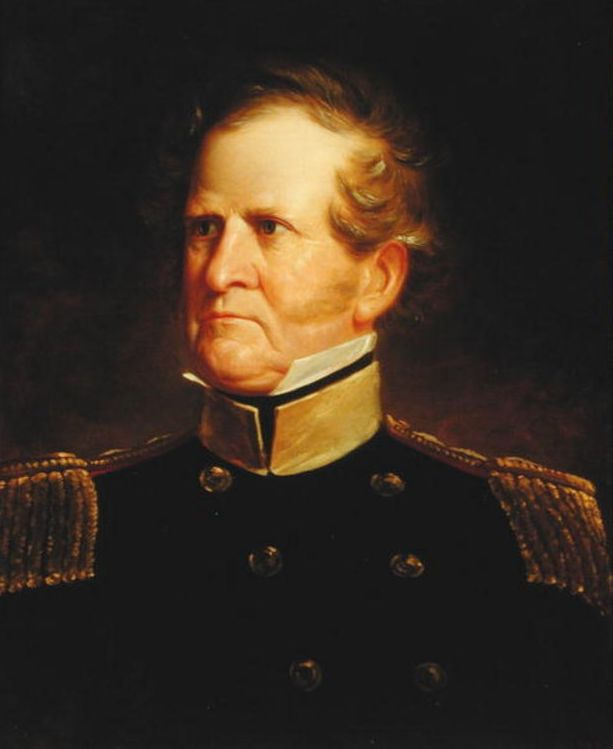
Winfield Scott age of 49, 1835 portrait by George Catlin

In 1832, President Andrew Jackson ordered Scott to Illinois to take command of a conflict known as the Black Hawk War. By the time Scott arrived in Illinois, the conflict had come to a close with the army's victory at the Battle of Bad Axe. Scott and Governor John Reynolds concluded the Black Hawk Purchase with Chief Keokuk and other Native American leaders, opening up much of present-day Iowa to settlement by whites. Later, in 1832, Jackson placed Scott in charge of army preparations for a potential conflict arising from the Nullification Crisis. Scott traveled to Charleston, South Carolina, the center of the nullification movement, where he strengthened federal forts but also sought to cultivate public opinion away from secession. Ultimately, the crisis ended in early 1833 with the passage of the Tariff of 1833.

=== Indian Removal ===
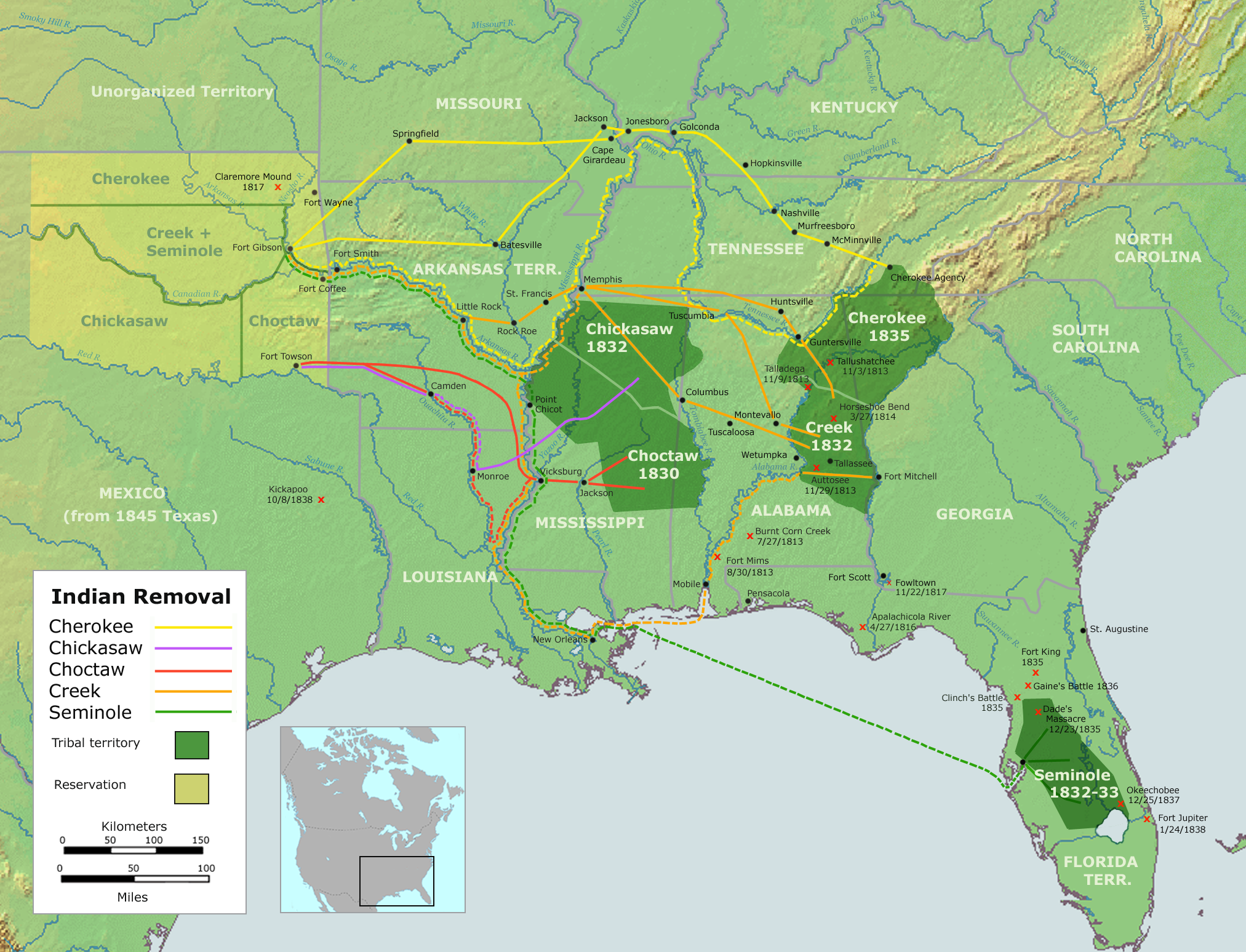
Routes of Southern removals

President Jackson launched a policy of Indian removal, forcing Native Americans to move west of the Mississippi River. Some Native Americans moved peacefully, but others resisted, including many Seminoles. In December 1835, the Second Seminole War broke out after the Dade battle, in which a group of Seminoles ambushed and wiped out a U.S. Army column in Central Florida. President Jackson ordered Scott to take command of operations against the Seminoles personally, and he had arrived in Florida by February 1836. After several months of inconclusive campaigning, Scott was ordered to the border of Alabama and Georgia to put down a Muscogee uprising known as the Creek War of 1836. American forces under Scott, General Thomas Jesup, and Alabama Governor Clement Comer Clay quickly defeated the Muscogee. Some subordinates and civilians criticized Scott's actions in the campaigns against the Seminole and the Muscogee, and President Jackson convened a Court of Inquiry that investigated Scott and Gaines. The court cleared Scott of misconduct; still, it reprimanded him for his language criticizing Gaines in official communications. The court was critical of Gaines' actions during the campaign, though it did not accuse him of misconduct or incompetence. It also criticized the language he used to defend himself publicly and to the court.

Martin Van Buren, a personal friend of Scott's, assumed the presidency in 1837, and Van Buren continued Jackson's Indian removal policy. In April 1838, Van Buren placed Scott in command of the removal of Cherokee people from the Southeastern United States. Some of Scott's associates tried to dissuade Scott from what they viewed as an immoral mission, but Scott accepted his orders. After almost all of the Cherokee refused to relocate voluntarily, Scott made careful plans to ensure that his soldiers forcibly but humanely relocated the Cherokee. Nonetheless, the Cherokee endured abuse from Scott's soldiers; one account described soldiers driving the Cherokee "like cattle, through rivers, allowing them no time to take off their shoes and stockings. In mid-1838, Scott agreed to Chief John Ross's plan to let the Cherokee lead a movement west, and he awarded a contract to the Cherokee Council to complete the removal. Scott was strongly criticized by many Southerners, including Jackson, for awarding the contract to Ross rather than continuing the removal under his own auspices. Scott accompanied one Cherokee group as an observer, traveling with them from Athens, Tennessee, to Nashville, Tennessee, where he was ordered to the Canada–United States border.

=== Tensions with the United Kingdom ===
In late 1837, the so-called "Patriot War" broke out along the Canadian border when some Americans sought to support the Rebellions of 1837–1838 in Canada. Tensions escalated after the Caroline affair, in which Canadian forces burned a steamboat that had delivered supplies to rebel forces. President Van Buren dispatched Scott to western New York to prevent unauthorized border crossings and war between the United States and the United Kingdom. Still popular in the area due to his service in the War of 1812, Scott issued public appeals, asking Americans to refrain from supporting the Canadian rebels. In late 1838, a new crisis known as the Aroostook War broke out over a dispute regarding the border between Maine and Canada, which had not been conclusively settled in previous treaties between Britain and the United States. Scott was tasked with preventing the conflict from escalating into a war. After winning the support of Governor John Fairfield and other Maine leaders, Scott negotiated a truce with John Harvey, who commanded British forces in the area.

=== Presidential election of 1840 ===
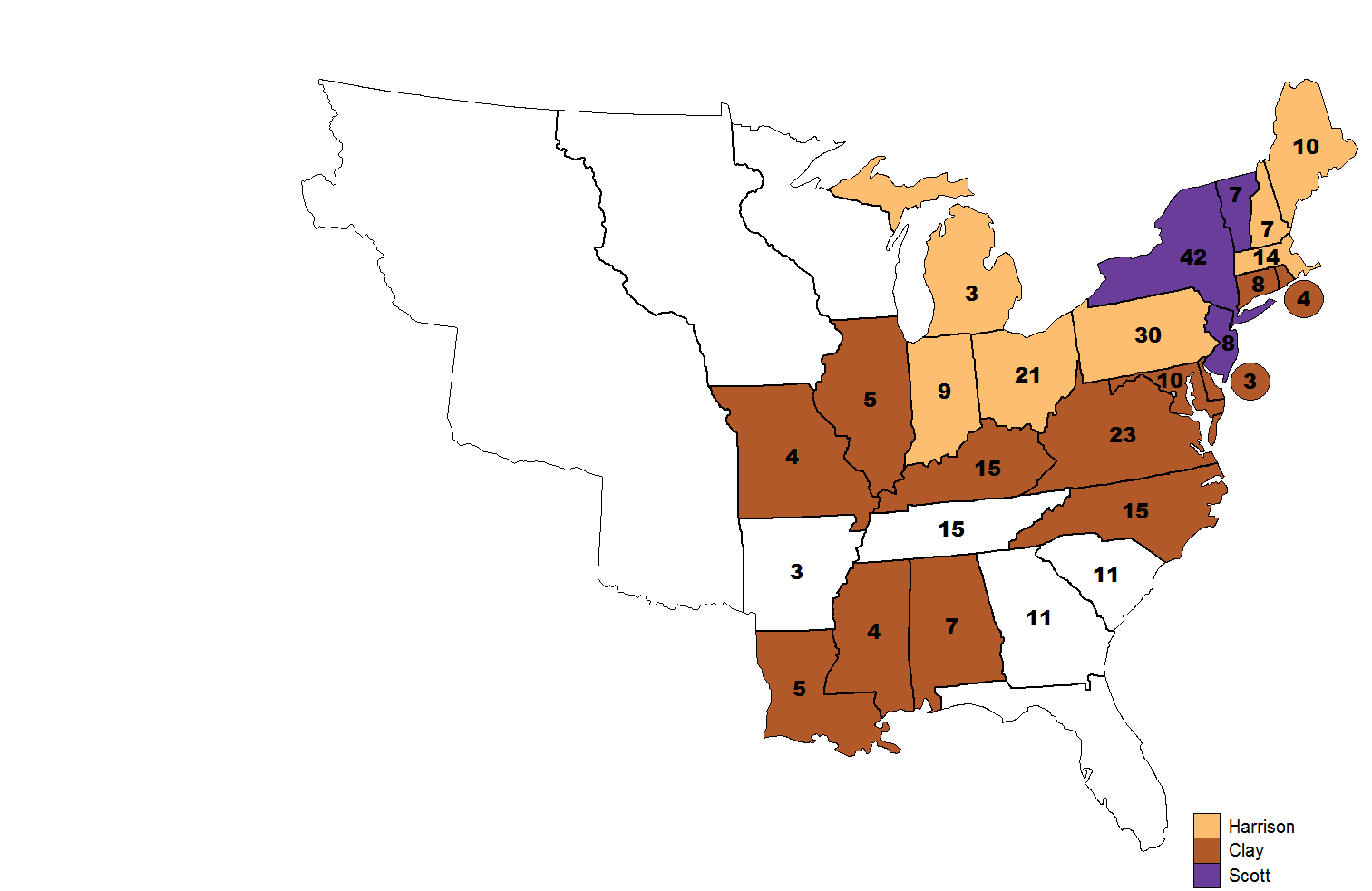
Scott (purple) won three states on the first ballot of the 1839 Whig National Convention, but the convention nominated William Henry Harrison for president.

In the mid-1830s, Scott joined the Whig Party, which opponents of President Jackson established. Scott's success in preventing war with Canada under Van Buren confirmed his popularity with the broad public, and in early 1839, newspapers began to mention him as a candidate for the presidential nomination at the 1839 Whig National Convention. By the time of the convention in December 1839, party leader Henry Clay and 1836 presidential candidate William Henry Harrison had emerged as the two front-runners, but Scott loomed as a potential compromise candidate if the convention deadlocked. After several ballots, the convention nominated Harrison for president. (Note: During the balloting, Clay and Scott played cards with Whig politicians John J. Crittenden and George Evans at the Astor House hotel in New York City. When the group received word of Harrison's victory, Clay blamed his loss on Scott and struck him, with the blow landing on the shoulder that had been wounded during Scott's participation in the Battle of Lundy's Lane. Afterward, Clay had to be physically removed from the hotel room. Scott then sent Crittenden to Clay with Scott's challenge for a duel, but Crittenden reconciled them by convincing Clay to apologize.) Harrison went on to defeat Van Buren in the 1840 presidential election, but he died just one month into his term and was succeeded by Vice President John Tyler.

== Commanding General, 1841–1861 ==
=== Service under Tyler ===
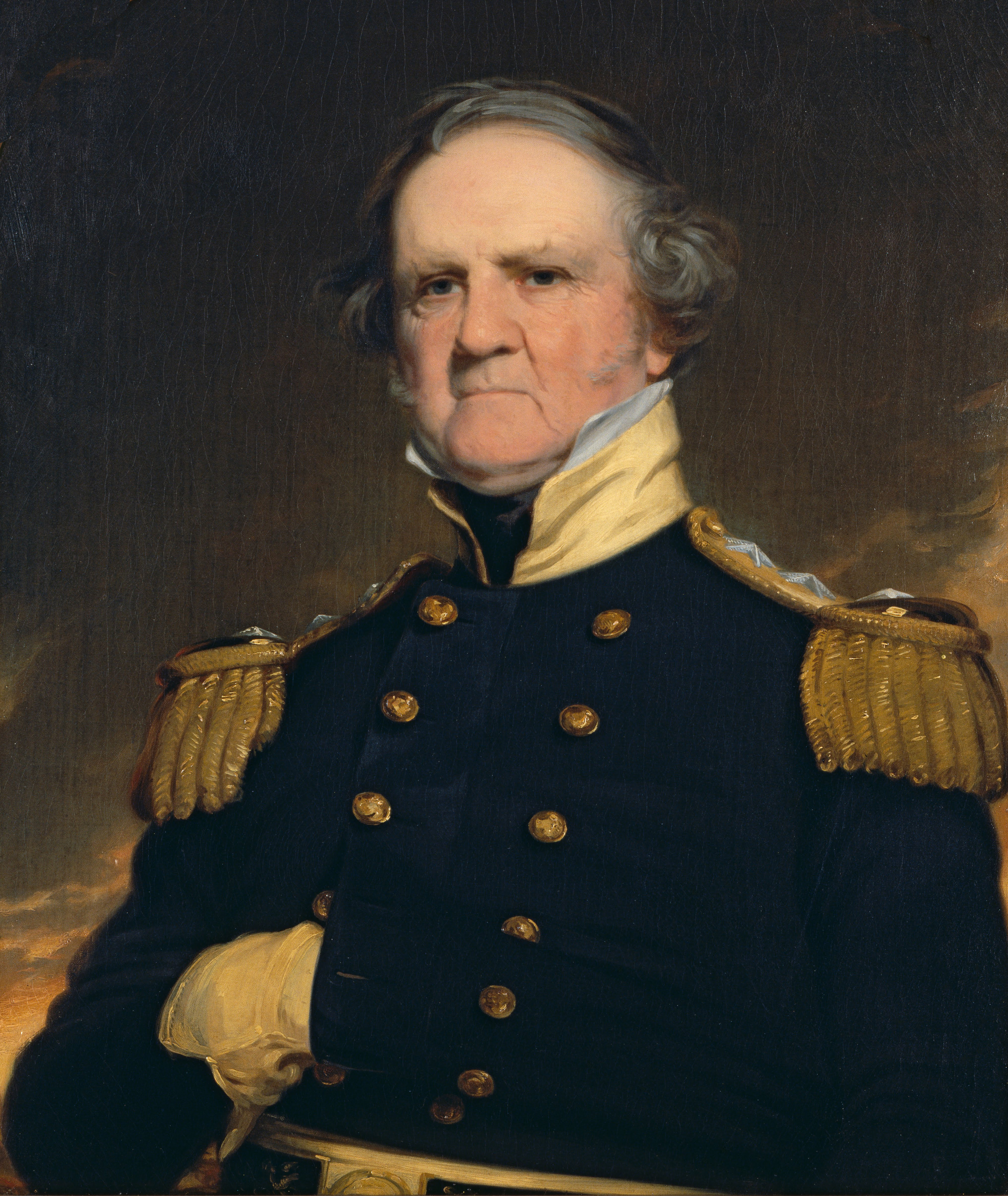
Painting of Scott by Robert Walter Weir, 1855

On June 25, 1841, Macomb died, and Scott and Gaines were still the two most obvious choices for the position of Commanding General of the United States Army. Secretary of War John Bell recommended Scott, and President Tyler approved; Scott was also promoted to the rank of major general. (Note: Gaines remained on active duty, but was increasingly marginalized. He commanded various districts and departments until he died in 1849.) According to biographer John Eisenhower, the office of commanding general had, since its establishment in 1821, been an "innocuous and artificial office ... its occupant had been given little control over the staff, and even worse, his advice was seldom sought by his civilian superiors." Macomb had largely been outside the chain of command, and senior commanders like Gaines, Scott, and Quartermaster General Thomas Jesup reported directly to the Secretary of War. Despite Scott's efforts to invigorate the office, he enjoyed little influence with President Tyler, who quickly became alienated from most of the Whig Party after taking office. Some Whigs, including Thaddeus Stevens of Pennsylvania, favored Scott as the Whig candidate in the 1844 presidential election. Still, Clay quickly emerged as the prohibitive front-runner for the Whig nomination. Clay won the 1844 Whig nomination, but he was defeated in the general election by Democrat James K. Polk. Polk's campaign centered on his support for the annexation of the Republic of Texas, which had gained independence from Mexico in 1836. After Polk won the election, Congress passed legislation enabling the annexation of Texas, and Texas achieved statehood in 1845.

=== Mexican–American War ===
==== Early war ====
Overview map of the war

Polk and Scott had never liked one another, and their distrust deepened after Polk became president, partly due to Scott's affiliation with the Whig Party. Polk came into office with two primary foreign policy goals: the acquisition of Oregon Country, which was under joint American and British rule, and the acquisition of Alta California, a Mexican province. The United States nearly went to war with Britain over Oregon, but the two powers ultimately agreed to partition Oregon Country at the 49th parallel north. The Mexican–American War broke out in April 1846 after U.S. forces under the command of Brigadier General Zachary Taylor clashed with Mexican forces north of the Rio Grande in a region claimed by both Mexico and Texas. Polk, Secretary of War William L. Marcy, and Scott agreed on a strategy in which the U.S. would capture Northern Mexico and then pursue a favorable peace settlement. While Taylor led the army in Northern Mexico, Scott presided over the expansion of the army, ensuring that new soldiers were properly supplied and organized.

==== Invasion of Central Mexico ====
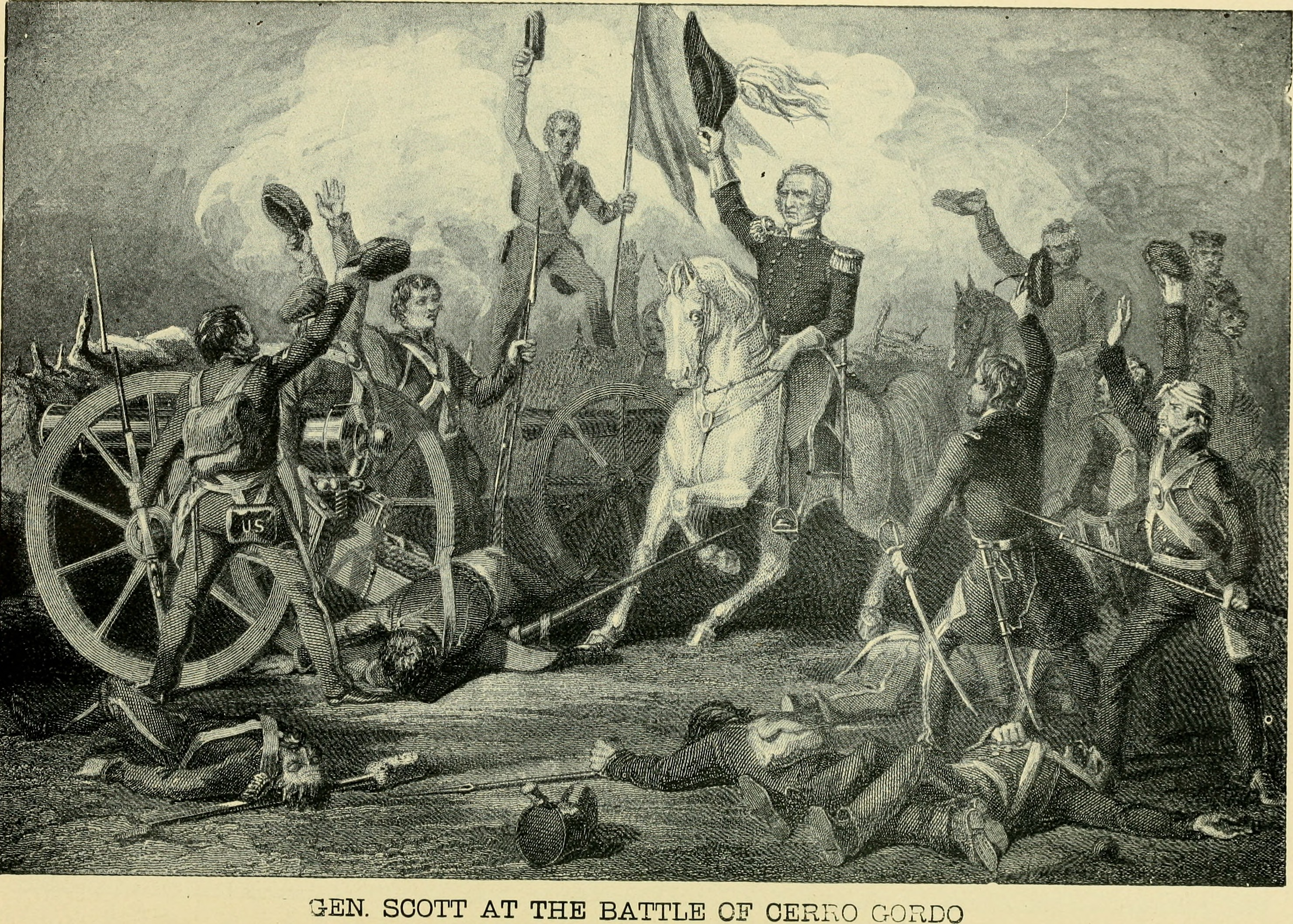
Allegorical depiction of Winfield Scott on horseback during the Battle of Cerro Gordo

Taylor won several victories against the Mexican army, but Polk eventually concluded that merely occupying Northern Mexico would not compel Mexico to surrender. Scott drew up an invasion plan that would begin with a naval assault on the Gulf port of Veracruz and end with the capture of Mexico City. With Congress unwilling to establish the rank of lieutenant general for Democratic Senator Thomas Hart Benton, Polk reluctantly turned to Scott to command the invasion. Among those who joined the campaign were several officers who would later distinguish themselves in the American Civil War, including Major Joseph E. Johnston, Captain Robert E. Lee, and Lieutenants Ulysses S. Grant, George B. McClellan, George G. Meade, and P. G. T. Beauregard. While Scott prepared the invasion, Taylor inflicted what the U.S. characterized as a crushing defeat on the army of Mexican President Antonio López de Santa Anna at the Battle of Buena Vista. In the encounter known in Mexico as the Battle of La Angostura, Santa Anna brought U.S. forces to near collapse, capturing cannons and flags, and returned to Mexico City, leaving U.S. forces on the field. Santa Anna left to put down a minor insurrection, and recruited a new army.

Biographer John Eisenhower said the invasion of Mexico through Veracruz was "up to that time the most ambitious amphibious expedition in human history." The operation commenced on March 9, 1847, with the Siege of Veracruz, a joint army-navy operation led by Scott and Commodore David Conner. (Note: During the siege, Conner, who was due for retirement, was replaced by Commodore Matthew C. Perry.) After safely landing his 12,000-man army, Scott encircled Veracruz and began bombarding it; the Mexican garrison surrendered on March 27. Seeking to avoid a rising by the divided Mexicans against the American invasion, Scott placed a priority on winning the cooperation of the Catholic Church. Among other initiatives designed to show respect for church property and officials, he ordered his men to salute Catholic priests on the streets of Veracruz. After securing supplies and wagons, Scott's army began the march toward Xalapa, a city on the way to Mexico City. Meanwhile, Polk dispatched Nicholas Trist, Secretary of State James Buchanan's chief clerk, to negotiate a peace treaty with Mexican leaders. Though they initially feuded, Scott and Trist eventually developed a strong working relationship.

In mid-April, Scott's force met Santa Anna's army at Cerro Gordo, near Xalapa. Santa Anna had established a solid defensive position, but he left his left flank undefended on the assumption that dense trees made the area impassable. Scott decided to attack Santa Anna's position on two fronts, sending a force led by David E. Twiggs against Santa Anna's left flank, while another force, led by Gideon Pillow, would attack Santa Anna's artillery. In the Battle of Cerro Gordo, Pillow's force was largely ineffective, but Twiggs and Colonel William S. Harney captured the key Mexican position of El Telegrafo in hand-to-hand fighting. Mexican resistance collapsed after the capture of El Telegrafo; Santa Anna escaped the battlefield and returned to Mexico City, but Scott's force captured about 3,000 Mexican soldiers. After the battle, Scott continued to press toward Mexico City, cutting him and his army off from his supply base at Veracruz.

==== Mexico City ====
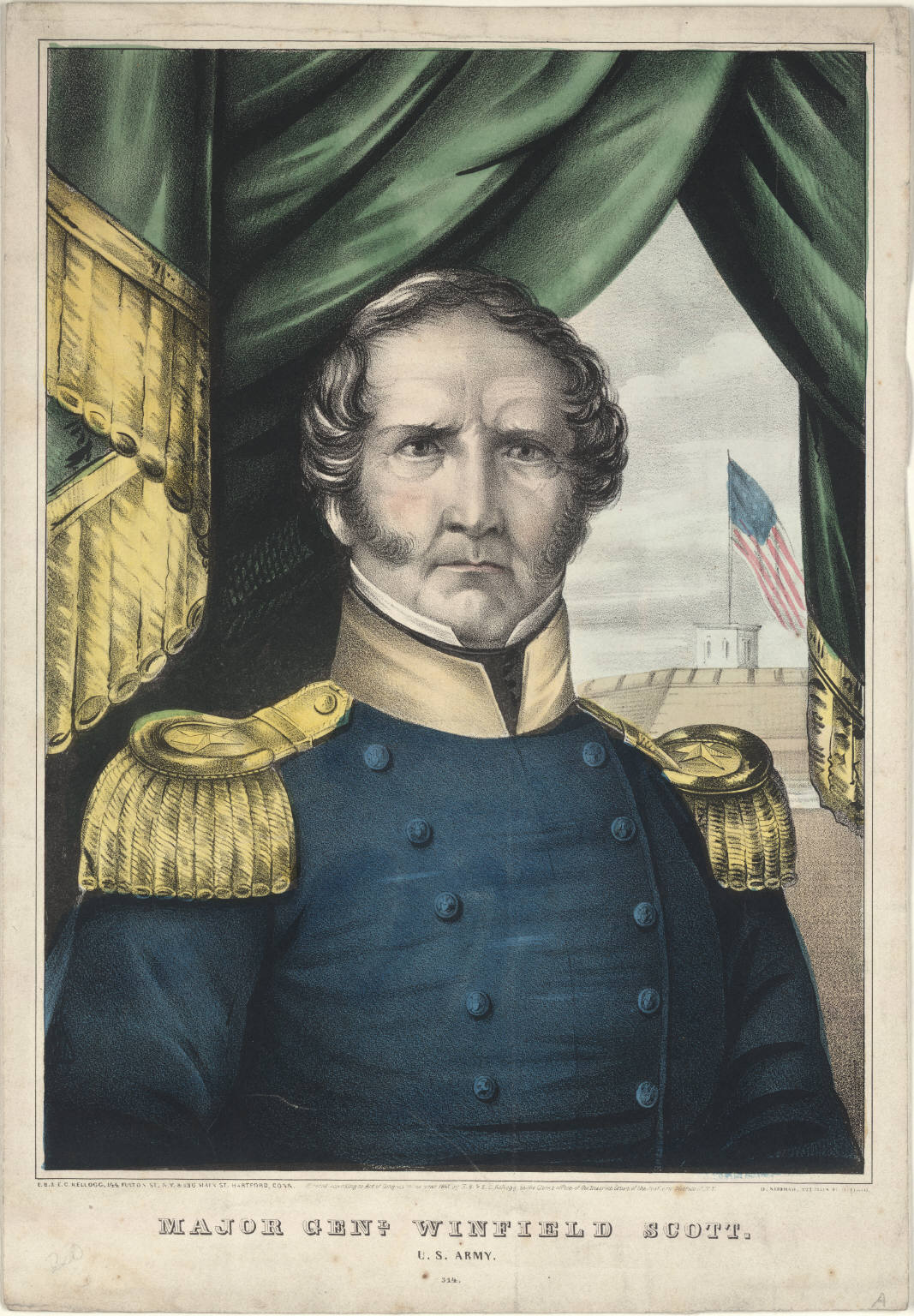
Engraving of Major General Scott, 1847

Scott's force arrived in the Valley of Mexico in August 1847, by which time Santa Anna had formed an army of approximately 25,000 men. Because Mexico City lacked walls and was essentially indefensible, Santa Anna sought to defeat Scott in a pitched battle, choosing to mount a defense near the Churubusco River several miles south. The Battle of Contreras began on the afternoon of August 19, when the Mexican army under General Gabriel Valencia attacked and pushed back an American detachment charged with building a road. In the early morning of the following day, an American force led by General Persifor Frazer Smith surprised and decimated Valencia's army. News of the defeat at Contreras caused a panic among the rest of Santa Anna's army, and Scott immediately pressed the attack, beginning the Battle of Churubusco. Despite the strong defense by the Saint Patrick's Battalion and some other units, Scott's force quickly defeated the demoralized Mexican army. After the battle, Santa Anna negotiated a truce with Scott, and the Mexican foreign minister notified Trist that they were ready to begin negotiations to end the war.

Despite the presence of Scott's army just outside of Mexico City, the Mexican and American delegations remained far apart on terms; Mexico was only willing to yield portions of Alta California and refused to accept the Rio Grande as its northern border. While negotiations continued, Scott faced a difficult issue in the disposition of 72 members of Saint Patrick's Battalion who had deserted from the U.S. Army and were captured while fighting for Mexico. All 72 were court-martialed and sentenced to death. Under pressure from some Mexican leaders and personally feeling that the death penalty was an unjust punishment for some defendants, Scott spared 20, but the rest were executed. In early September, negotiations between Trist and the Mexican government broke down, and Scott exercised his right to end the truce. In the subsequent Battle for Mexico City, Scott launched an attack from the west of the city, capturing the critical fortress of Chapultepec on September 13. Santa Anna retreated from the city after the fall of Chapultepec, and Scott accepted the surrender of the remaining Mexican forces early on the 14th.

Unrest broke out in the days following the capture of Mexico City, but with the cooperation of civil leaders and the Catholic Church, Scott and the army restored order in the city by the end of the month. Peace negotiations between Trist and the Mexican government resumed, and Scott did all he could to support the talks, ceasing all further offensive operations. As military commander of Mexico City, Scott was held in high esteem by Mexican civil and American authorities alike, primarily owing to the fairness with which he treated Mexican citizens. In November 1847, Trist received orders to return to Washington. Scott received orders to continue the military campaign against Mexico; Polk had grown frustrated at the slow pace of negotiations. With the support of Scott and Mexican president Manuel de la Peña y Peña, Trist defied his orders and continued the negotiations. Trist and the Mexican negotiators concluded the Treaty of Guadalupe Hidalgo (Note: In the Treaty of Guadalupe Hidalgo, Mexico ceded Alta California and Santa Fe de Nuevo México and recognized the Rio Grande as the southern border of the United States. In return, the United States paid Mexico $15 million. Along with the 1854 Gadsden Purchase, it set the Mexico–United States border.) on February 2, 1848; it was ratified by the U.S. Senate the following month. In late 1847, Scott arrested Pillow and two other officers after they wrote letters to American newspapers that were critical of Scott. In response, Polk ordered the release of the three officers and removed Scott from command.

Upon founding the Aztec Club of 1847, a military society of officers who served in Mexico during the war, Scott was elected as one of only two honorary members of the organization.

=== Taylor and Fillmore administrations ===
Scott (blue) received a significant amount of support on the first ballot of the 1848 Whig National Convention, but the convention nominated Zachary Taylor for president.

Scott was again a contender for the Whig presidential nomination in the 1848 election. Clay, Daniel Webster, and General Zachary Taylor were also candidates for the nomination. As in 1840, Whigs were looking for a non-ideological war hero to be their candidate. Scott's main appeal was to anti-slavery "conscience Whigs", who were dismayed by the fact that two of the leading contenders, Clay and Taylor, were enslavers. Ultimately, however, the delegates passed on Scott for a second time, nominating Taylor on the fourth ballot. Many anti-slavery Whigs then defected to support the nominee of the Free-Soil Party, former President Martin Van Buren. Taylor went on to win the general election.

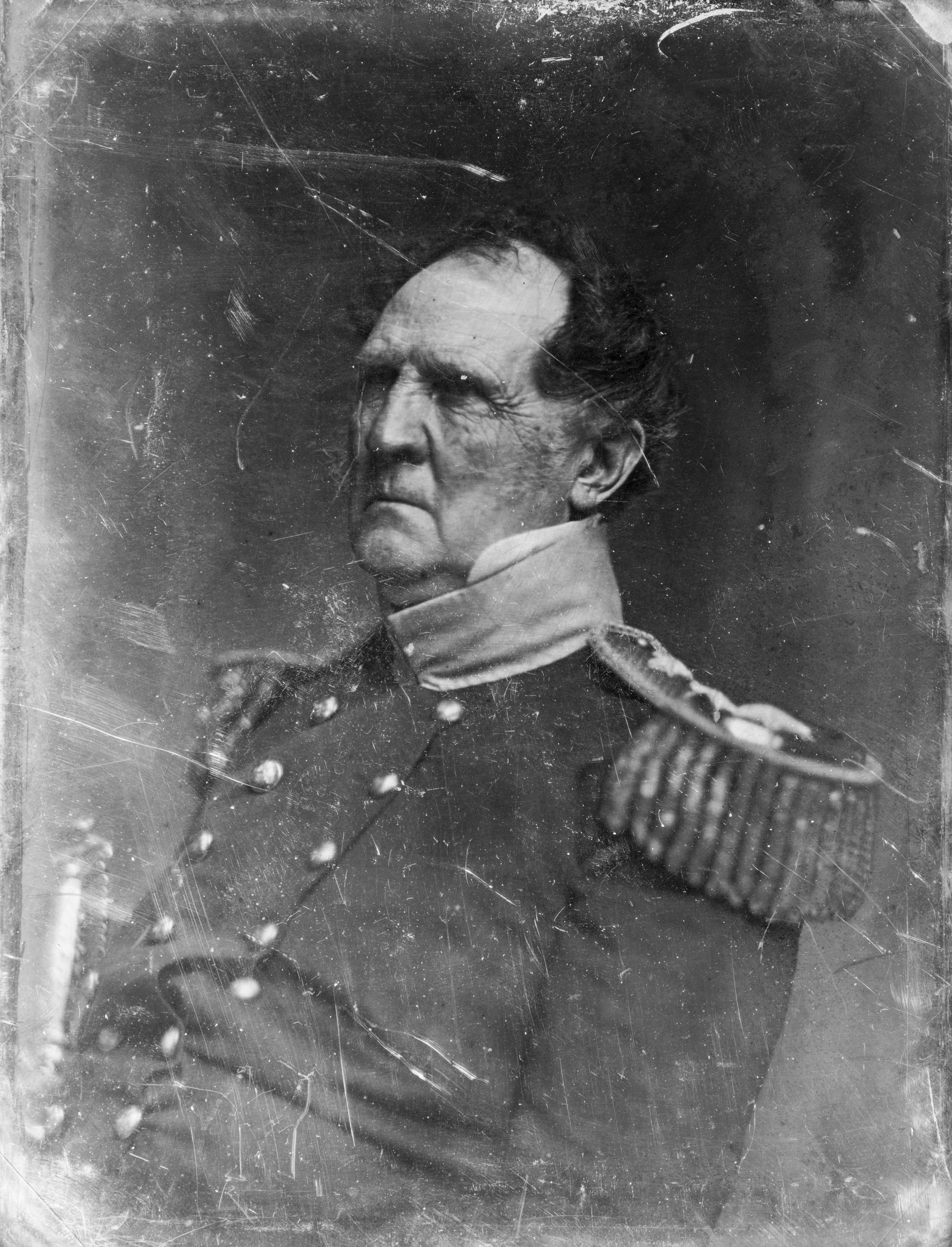
1849 daguerreotype of Scott

After the war, Scott returned to his administrative duties as the army's senior general. Congress became engaged in a divisive debate over the status of slavery in the territories, and Scott joined with Whig leaders Henry Clay and Daniel Webster in advocating for the passage of what became known as the Compromise of 1850. Meanwhile, Taylor died of an illness in July 1850 and was succeeded by Vice President Millard Fillmore. The Compromise of 1850 and the enforcement of the Fugitive Slave Act of 1850 badly divided the country as a whole and the Whig Party in particular. Northerners strongly objected to the stringent provisions of the act, while Southerners complained bitterly about any perceived slackness in enforcement. Despite Scott's support for the Compromise of 1850, he became the chosen candidate of William Seward, a leading Northern Whig who objected to the Compromise of 1850 partly because of the fugitive slave act.

=== Presidential election of 1852 ===
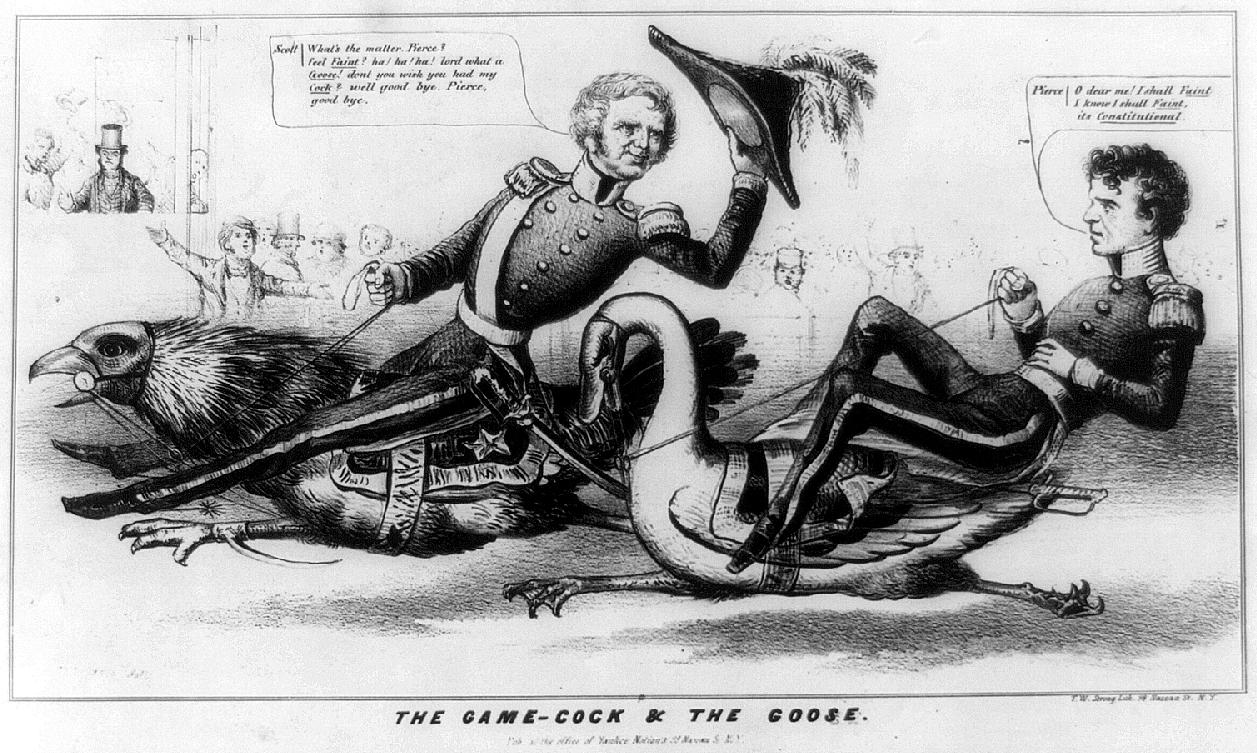
The Game-cock & the Goose, an 1852 Whig cartoon favoring Winfield Scott

Democrat Franklin Pierce defeated Whig Winfield Scott in the 1852 election.

By early 1852, the three leading candidates for the Whig presidential nomination were Scott, whom anti-Compromise Northern Whigs backed; President Fillmore, the first choice of most Southern Whigs; and Secretary of State Webster, whose support was concentrated in New England. The 1852 Whig National Convention convened on June 16, and Southern delegates won approval of a party platform endorsing the Compromise of 1850 as a final settlement of the slavery question. On the convention's first presidential ballot, Fillmore received 133 of the necessary 147 votes, while Scott won 131 and Webster won 29. After the 46th ballot still failed to produce a presidential nominee, the delegates voted to adjourn until the following Monday. Over the weekend, Fillmore and Webster supporters conducted unsuccessful negotiations to unite behind one candidate. On the 48th ballot, Webster delegates began to defect to Scott, and the general gained the nomination on the 53rd ballot. Fillmore accepted his defeat with equanimity and endorsed Scott, but many Northern Whigs were dismayed when Scott publicly endorsed the party's pro-Compromise platform. Despite the party's effort to appeal to southerners by nominating William Alexander Graham of North Carolina for vice president, many Southern Whigs, including Alexander H. Stephens and Robert Toombs, refused to support Scott.

The 1852 Democratic National Convention nominated dark horse candidate Franklin Pierce, a Northerner sympathetic to the Southern view on slavery who had served under Scott as a brigadier general during the Mexican War. Pierce had resigned from the U.S. Senate in 1842, and had briefly held only the minor office of United States Attorney for the District of New Hampshire since then, but emerged as a compromise candidate partly because he served under Scott in the Mexican–American War. The Democrats attacked Scott for various incidents from his long public career, including his court-martial in 1809 and the hanging of members of the Saint Patrick's Battalion during the Mexican–American War. Scott proved to be a poor candidate who lacked popular appeal and suffered the worst defeat in Whig history. In the South, distrust and apathy toward Scott led many Southern Whigs to vote for Pierce or to sit out the election, and in the North, many anti-slavery Whigs voted for John P. Hale of the Free Soil Party. Scott won just four states and 44 percent of the popular vote, while Pierce won just under 51 percent of the popular vote and a large majority of the electoral vote.

=== Pierce and Buchanan administrations ===
After the 1852 election, Scott continued his duties as the army's senior officer. He maintained cordial relations with President Pierce but frequently clashed with Pierce's Secretary of War, Jefferson Davis, over issues such as travel expenses. Despite his defeat in the 1852 presidential race, Scott remained broadly popular, and on Pierce's recommendation, in 1855, Congress passed a resolution promoting Scott to brevet lieutenant general. Scott was the first U.S. Army officer since George Washington to hold the rank. (Note: Prior to the American Civil War, Washington and Scott were the only U.S. Army officers to hold the rank of lieutenant general, although Washington held the rank as a permanent, rather than brevet, appointment. In 1864, Ulysses S. Grant was promoted to lieutenant general. Later in the nineteenth century, William Tecumseh Sherman, Philip Sheridan, and John Schofield would also hold the rank of lieutenant general.) He also earned the appellation of the "Grand Old Man of the Army" for his long career.

The passage of the 1854 Kansas–Nebraska Act and the outbreak of violent confrontations between pro-slavery and anti-slavery forces in Kansas exacerbated sectional tensions and split both major parties. Pierce was denied re-nomination in favor of James Buchanan, while the Whig Party collapsed. In the 1856 presidential election, Buchanan defeated John C. Frémont of the anti-slavery Republican Party and former President Fillmore, the candidate of the nativist American Party. Sectional tensions continued to escalate after the Supreme Court handed down its decision in Dred Scott v. Sandford. Buchanan proved incapable of healing sectional divides, and some leading Southerners became increasingly vocal in their desire to secede from the union. In 1859, Buchanan assigned Scott to lead a mission to settle a dispute with Britain over the ownership of the San Juan Islands in the Pacific Northwest. Scott reached an agreement with British official James Douglas to reduce military forces on the islands, thereby resolving the so-called "Pig War".

In the 1860 presidential election, the Republicans nominated Abraham Lincoln, while the Democrats split along sectional lines, with Northern Democrats supporting Senator Stephen A. Douglas and Southern Democrats supporting Vice President John C. Breckinridge. Lincoln won the election, taking just 39.7 percent of the popular vote but winning a majority of the electoral vote due to his support in the North despite his name not being on the ballot in many Southern States. Fearing the possibility of imminent secession, Scott advised Buchanan and Secretary of War John B. Floyd to reinforce federal forts in the South. He was initially ignored, but Scott gained new influence within the administration after Floyd was replaced by Joseph Holt in mid-December. With assistance from Holt and newly appointed Secretary of State Jeremiah S. Black, Scott convinced Buchanan to reinforce or resupply Washington, D.C., Fort Sumter (near Charleston, South Carolina), and Fort Pickens (near Pensacola, Florida). Meanwhile, several Southern states seceded, formed the Confederate States of America, and chose Jefferson Davis as president.

Because Scott was from Virginia, Lincoln sent an envoy, Thomas S. Mather, to ask whether Scott would remain loyal to the United States and keep order during Lincoln's inauguration. Scott responded to Mather, "I shall consider myself responsible for [Lincoln's] safety. If necessary, I shall plant cannon at both ends of Pennsylvania Avenue, and if any of the Maryland or Virginia gentlemen who have become so threatening and troublesome show their heads or even venture to raise a finger, I shall blow them to hell." Scott helped ensure that Lincoln arrived in Washington safely and ensured the security of Lincoln's inauguration, which ultimately was conducted without a major incident.

=== Lincoln administration ===
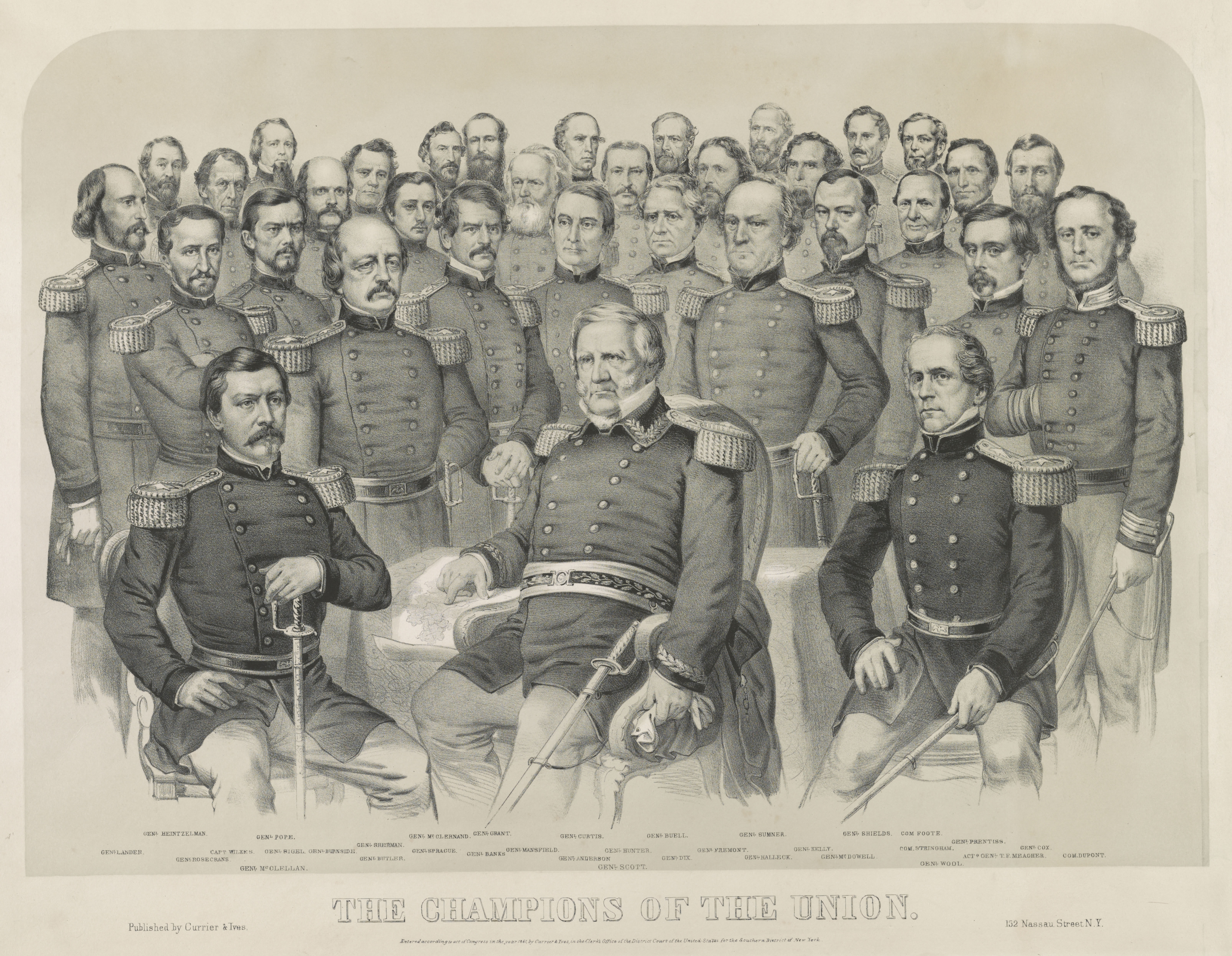
1861 Currier & Ives engraving of Winfield Scott and other Union generals, indicative of the Northern sentiment toward him and others in 1861

By the time Lincoln assumed office, seven states had declared their secession and had seized federal property within their bounds. Still, the United States retained control of the military installations at Fort Sumter and Fort Pickens. Scott advised evacuating the forts because an attempted re-supply would inflame tensions with the South, and Confederate shore batteries made re-supply impossible. Lincoln rejected the advice and chose to re-supply the forts; although Scott accepted the orders, his resistance to the re-supply mission, along with poor health, undermined his status within the administration. Nonetheless, he remained a critical military adviser and administrator. On April 12, Confederate forces began an attack on Fort Sumter, forcing its surrender the following day. On April 15, Lincoln declared that a state of rebellion existed and called up 75,000 militiamen. On the advice of Scott, Lincoln offered Robert E. Lee command of the Union forces, but Lee ultimately chose to serve the Confederacy.

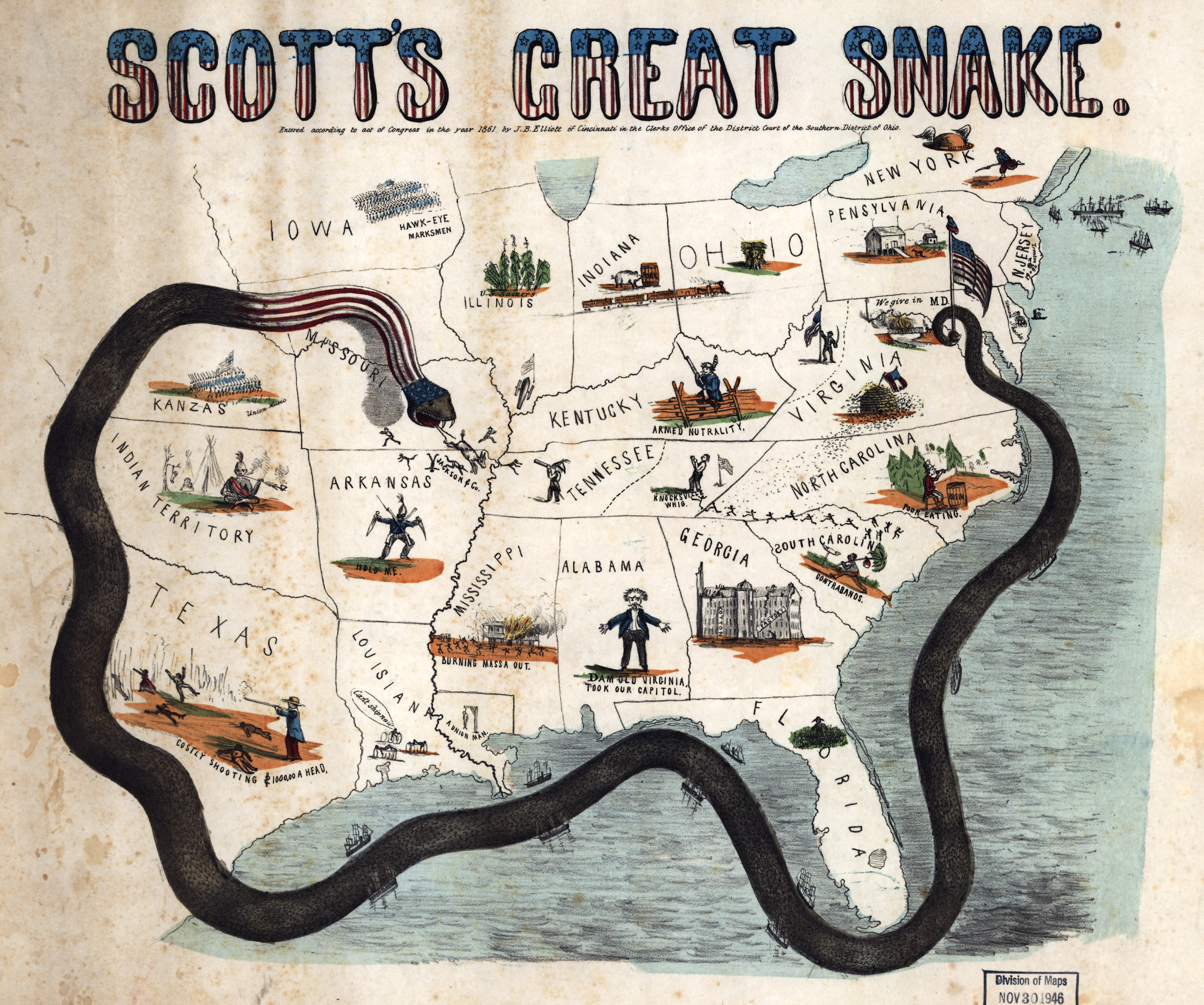
1861 characterized map of Scott's "Anaconda Plan" to squeeze the South

Scott took charge of molding Union military personnel into a cohesive fighting force. Lincoln rejected Scott's proposal to build up the regular army, (Note: The regular army consisted of just 17,000 men at the start of the Civil War.) and the administration would largely rely on volunteers to fight the war. Scott developed a strategy, later known as the Anaconda Plan, that called for the capture of the Mississippi River and a blockade of Southern ports. By cutting off the eastern states of the Confederacy, Scott hoped to force the surrender of Confederate forces with a minimal loss of life on both sides. Scott's plan was leaked to the public and was derided by most Northern newspapers, which tended to favor an immediate assault on the Confederacy. As Scott was too old for battlefield command, Lincoln selected General Irvin McDowell, an officer whom Scott saw as unimaginative and inexperienced, to lead the main Union army in the eastern theater of the war. Though Scott counseled that the army needed more time to train, Lincoln ordered an offensive against the Confederate capital of Richmond. Irvin McDowell led a force of 30,000 men south, where he met the Confederate Army at the First Battle of Bull Run. The Confederate army dealt the Union a major defeat, ending any hope of a quick end to the war.

McDowell took the brunt of public vituperation for the defeat at Bull Run, but Scott, who had helped plan the battle, also received criticism. Lincoln replaced McDowell with McClellan, and the president began meeting with McClellan without Scott in attendance. Frustrated with his diminished standing, Scott submitted his resignation in October 1861. Though Scott favored General Henry Halleck as his successor, Lincoln made McClellan the army's senior officer instead.

== Retirement, consultations, writings, and death ==
Scott grew very heavy in his last years of service and could not mount a horse or walk more than a few paces without stopping to rest. He was often in ill health, and suffered from gout, dropsy, rheumatism, and vertigo. After retiring, he traveled to Europe with his daughter, Cornelia, and her husband, H. L. Scott. In Paris, he worked with Thurlow Weed to aid American consul John Bigelow in defusing the Trent Affair, a diplomatic incident with Britain. On his return from Europe in December 1861, he lived alone in New York City and at West Point, New York, where he wrote his memoirs and closely followed the ongoing civil war.

On June 23–24, 1862, President Lincoln made an unannounced visit to West Point, where he spent five hours consulting with Scott regarding the handling of the Civil War and the staffing of the War Department. After McClellan's defeat in the Seven Days Battles, Lincoln accepted Scott's advice and appointed General Halleck as the army's senior general. In 1864, Scott sent a copy of his newly published memoirs to Ulysses S. Grant, who had succeeded Halleck as the lead Union general. The copy that Scott sent was inscribed "from the oldest to the greatest general." Following a strategy similar to Scott's Anaconda Plan, Grant led the Union to victory, and Lee's Army of Northern Virginia surrendered in April 1865.

On October 4, 1865, Scott was elected as a Companion of the Pennsylvania Commandery of the Military Order of the Loyal Legion of the United States and was assigned insignia number 27. He is one of the few individuals who belonged to the three most senior military societies of the United States – the Society of the Cincinnati, the Aztec Club of 1847 and the Loyal Legion.

Scott died at West Point on the morning of May 29, 1866, at age 79. President Andrew Johnson ordered flags flown at half-staff to honor Scott. His funeral was attended by many of the leading Union generals, including Grant, George G. Meade, George H. Thomas, and John Schofield. He is buried at the West Point Cemetery.

== Legacy ==
=== Historical reputation ===
External videos
- Booknotes interview with John Eisenhower on Agent of Destiny, April 19, 1998, C-SPAN

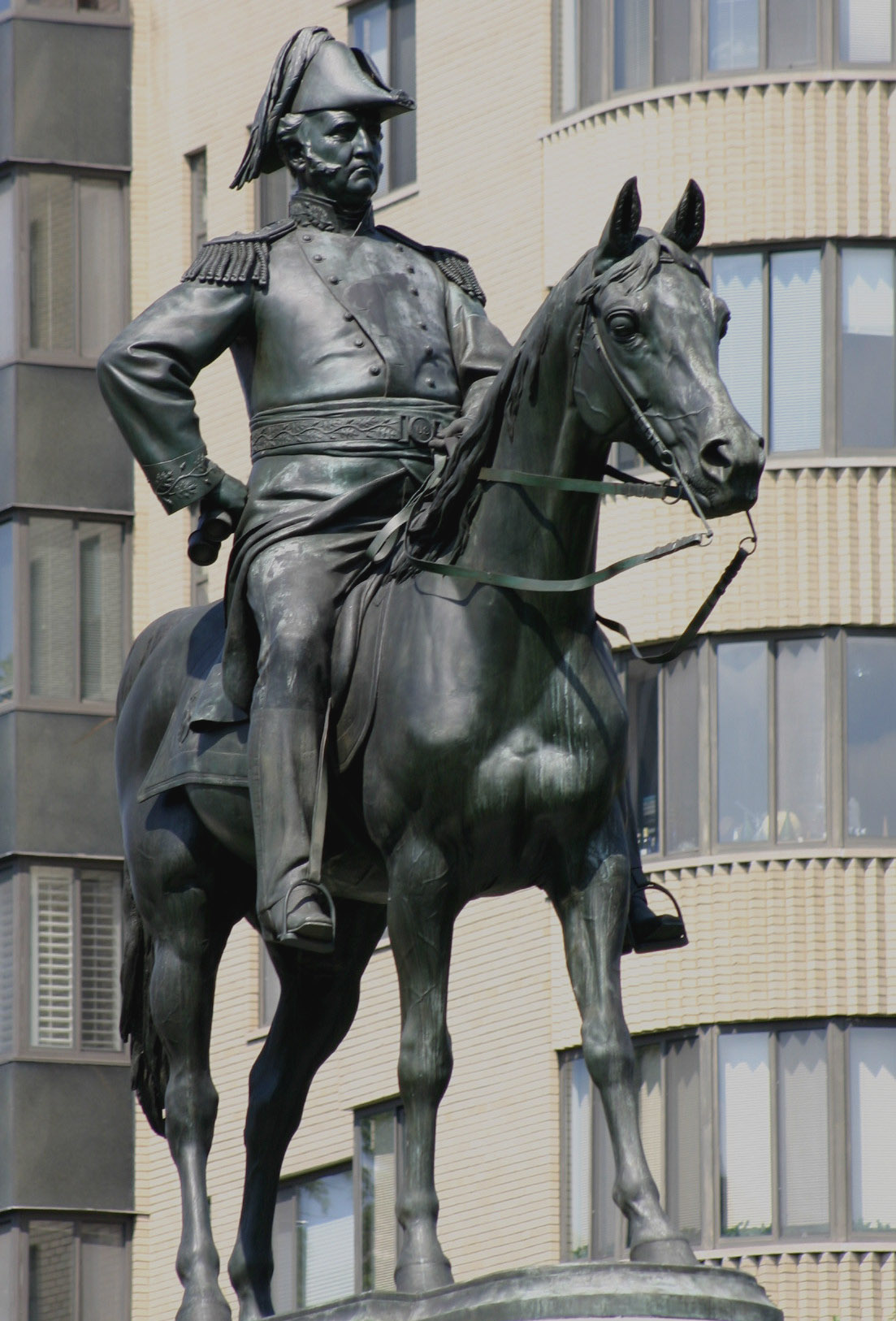
Statue of Winfield Scott on Scott Circle in Washington, D.C.

Scott holds the record for the greatest length of active service as a general in the U.S. Army, as well as the longest tenure as the army's chief officer. Steven Malanga of City Journal writes that "Scott was one of America's greatest generals ... but he had the misfortune to serve in two conflicts—the War of 1812 and the controversial Mexican-American War—bracketed by the far more significant American Revolution and Civil War." Biographer John Eisenhower writes that Scott "was an astonishing man" who was the country's "most prominent general" between the retirement of Andrew Jackson in 1821 and the onset of the Civil War in 1861. The Duke of Wellington proclaimed Scott "the greatest living general" after his capture of Mexico City. Robert E. Lee wrote, "the great cause of our success [in Mexico] was in our leader [Scott]". Historians Scott Kaufman and John A. Soares Jr. write that Scott was "an able diplomat who proved crucial in helping avert war between Britain and the United States in period after the War of 1812." Fanny Crosby, the hymn writer, recalled that Scott's "gentle manner did not indicate a hero of so many battles; yet there was strength beneath the exterior appearance and a heart of iron within his breast. But from him I learned that the warrior only it is, who can fully appreciate the blessing of peace."

In addition to his reputation as a tactician and strategist, Scott was also noteworthy for his concern about the welfare of his subordinates, as demonstrated by his willingness to risk his career in the dispute with Wilkinson over the Louisiana bivouac site. In another example, when cholera broke out among his soldiers while they were aboard the ship during the Black Hawk campaign and the ship's surgeon was incapacitated by the disease, Scott had the doctor tutor him in treatment and risked his health by tending to the sick troops himself.

Scott was the recipient of several honorary degrees. These included a Master of Arts from the College of New Jersey (now Princeton University) in 1814, a Doctor of Laws (LL.D.) from Columbia University in 1850, and an LL.D. from Harvard University in 1861.

=== Memorials ===
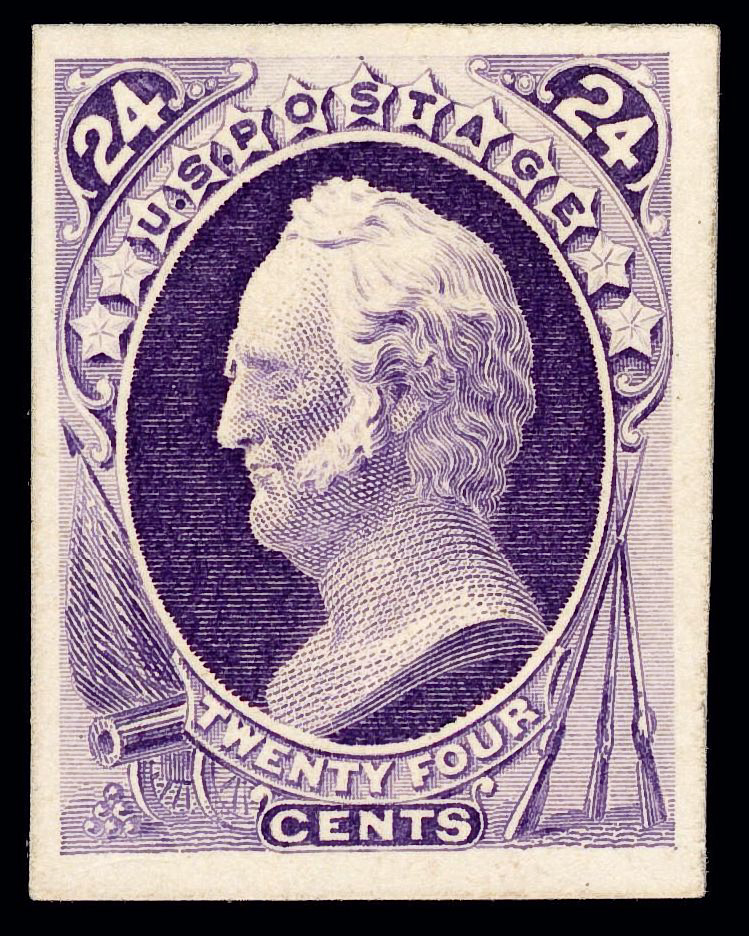
First Winfield Scott stamp, issue of 1870

Scott has been memorialized in numerous ways. Various counties are named for him, including Scott County, Iowa; Scott County, Kansas; Scott County, Virginia; Scott County, Minnesota; and Scott County, Tennessee. Communities named for Scott include Winfield, Illinois; Winfield, Indiana; Winfield, Iowa; West Winfield, NY; Winfield, Alabama; and Winfield, Tennessee; Fort Scott, Kansas; and Scott Depot and Winfield, West Virginia. Fort Winfield Scott at the Presidio of San Francisco was part of the coastal defenses of San Francisco Bay from 1861 to 1970, and is now a part of the Fort Point National Historic Site. Other things named for Scott include Lake Winfield Scott in Georgia, Mount Scott in Oklahoma, and the Scott's oriole, a bird.

A statue of Scott stands at Scott Circle in Washington, D.C. Scott was honored by having his likeness depicted on a U.S. postage stamp. A paddle steamer named Winfield Scott launched in 1850, and a U.S. Army tugboat in service in the 21st century is named Winfield Scott. Scott is the namesake of various people, including officers Union General Winfield Scott Hancock, Confederate General Winfield Scott Featherston, and Admiral Winfield Scott Schley. The U.S. Army Civil Affairs Association views General Scott as the "Father of Civil Affairs" and the regimental award medallions bear his name.

The General Winfield Scott House, his home in New York City from 1853 to 1855, was named a National Historic Landmark in 1975. Scott's papers are held by the William L. Clements Library at the University of Michigan at Ann Arbor, Michigan.

== Dates of rank ==
=== United States Army ===
Date	Insignia	Rank	Brevet Promotions
May 3, 1808		Captain	
July 6, 1812		Lieutenant colonel	
March 12, 1813		Colonel	
March 9, 1814		Brigadier general	Bvt. Major general (1814) (Note: July 25, 1814, for distinguished service in the successive battles of Chippawa and Niagara and for uniform gallantry and good conduct as an officer in the army.)
June 25, 1841		Major general	Bvt. Lieutenant general (1847) (Note: March 29, 1847, for eminent service in the Mexican-American War.)
November 1, 1861	Placed on the retired list with the rank of brevet lieutenant general (died May 29, 1866).		

== In popular culture ==
Scott's fame and political career led to publishing various works, including almanacs with titles such as Scott & Taylor Almanac or General Taylor Almanac plus multiple musical compositions. In 1848, Boston publisher Hall produced the Scott & Taylor Almanac to capitalize on the name recognition of the Mexican–American War's two most famous generals while other almanacs including an 1853 almanac with the title of The Gen. Scott Almanac were published as campaign literature in 1852. In 1852, Huestis and Couzans of New York City published Scott and Graham Melodies, a book of songs used during the 1852 presidential campaign. Another book of songs used by Whig campaigners in 1852, The Scott Songster, was published by Edwards & Goshorn of Cincinnati. In 1861, Stephen Glover created an instrumental music piece in Scott's honor titled General Scott's Grand Review March.

Actor Roy Gordon portrayed Scott in the 1953 film Kansas Pacific. Sydney Greenstreet played Scott in the 1941 film They Died with their Boots On. Scott was played by Patrick Bergin in the 1999 film One Man's Hero, a drama about the Mexican–American War's Saint Patrick's Battalion.

Scott is mentioned in "Hour of the Wolf", a Season 6 episode of the Outlander TV series. During a scene set during the American Revolution, Jamie asks what will be the fate of the Cherokee people. Brianna, who has traveled back in time from the 1960s, tells Jamie about the Trail of Tears and Scott's role in it.

== See also ==
- List of major generals in the United States Regular Army before 1 July 1920

== Citations ==
Military offices
Preceded by Alexander Macomb	Commanding General of the United States Army; 1841–1861	Succeeded by George B. McClellan
Party political offices
Preceded by Zachary Taylor	Whig nominee for President of the United States; 1852	Succeeded by Millard Fillmore; Endorsed
