= SS Badger =

Passenger and vehicle ferry in the United States

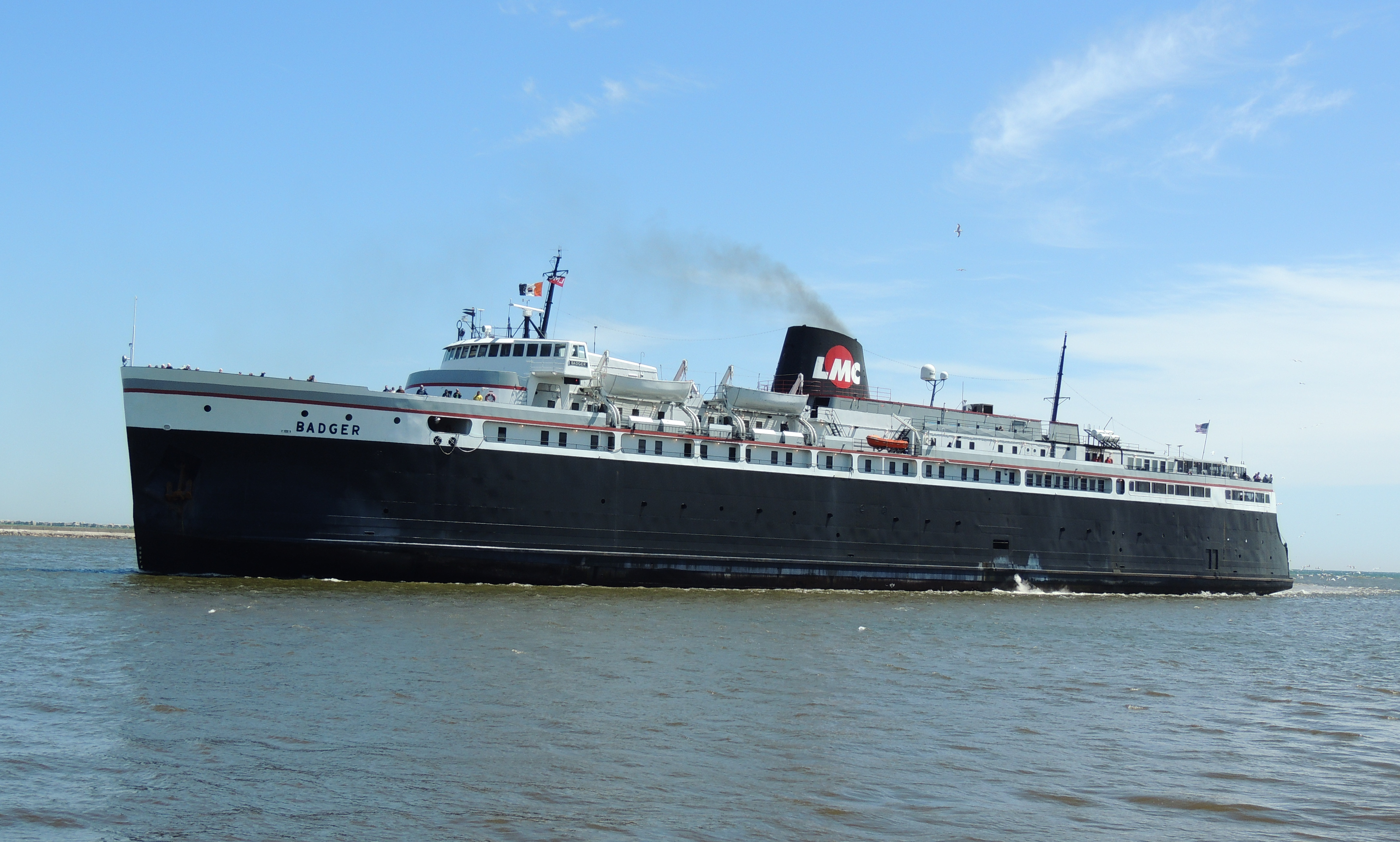
- SS Badger arriving in Manitowoc in 2025

History

United States
- Name: SS Badger
- Namesake: University of Wisconsin Badgers
- Owner: Interlake Maritime Services
- Operator: Lake Michigan Carferry
- Port of registry: Ludington, Michigan
- Route: US 10, Ludington, Michigan–Manitowoc, Wisconsin
- Builder: Christy Corporation, Sturgeon Bay, Wisconsin
- Yard number: Hull No. 370
- Launched: September 6, 1952
- Sponsored by: Mrs. Walter J. Kohler (wife of Governor of Wisconsin)
- In service: March 21, 1953
- Identification: Official No. 265156; IMO number: 5033583
- Status: Active

General characteristics
- Type: Passenger and automobile car ferry
- Tonnage: 4,244 gross tons
- Displacement: 6,650 tons
- Length: 410 ft 6 in (125.12 m)
- Beam: 59 ft 6 in (18.14 m)
- Height: 106 ft 9 in (32.54 m)
- Depth: 24 ft (7.32 m) molded depth
- Decks: 2 passenger, 2 vehicle
- Installed power: Steam, coal-fired
- Propulsion: Two four-cylinder compound Skinner Unaflow steam engines, totaling 7,000 shp (5.22 MW); four Foster-Wheeler water-tube type D boilers, 470 psi (3.24 MPa)
- Speed: 21 kn (39 km/h; 24 mph) max; 16 kn (29 km/h; 18 mph) cruise
- Capacity: 620 passengers, 180 automobiles, also tour buses, RVs, motorcycles, and commercial trucks
- Crew: 50–60
- SS Badger
- U.S. National Register of Historic Places
- U.S. National Historic Landmark
- Michigan State Historic Site
- Location: 700 S. William Street, Ludington, Michigan
- Coordinates: 43°56′57″N 86°27′04″W
- NRHP reference No.: 09000679

Significant dates
- Added to NRHP: December 11, 2009
- Designated NHL: January 20, 2016
- Designated MSHS: March 6, 1997

SS Badger is a passenger and vehicle ferry in the United States that has been in service on Lake Michigan since 1953. Currently, the ship shuttles between Ludington, Michigan, and Manitowoc, Wisconsin, a distance of 62 miles (100 km), connecting U.S. Highway 10 (US 10) between those two cities. She is the last coal-fired passenger vessel operating on the Great Lakes, and was designated a National Historic Landmark on January 20, 2016.

The ship is named after the University of Wisconsin's athletic teams, the Wisconsin Badgers. Badger runs on Michigan time (Eastern Time Zone, whereas Wisconsin is in the Central Time Zone) and riders pay Michigan taxes on their fares. She runs on a seasonal basis from May to October.

== History ==
Badger was constructed as a rail car ferry in 1952 by the Christy Corporation of Sturgeon Bay, Wisconsin, along with her twin SS Spartan (named after the mascot of Michigan State University) with a reinforced hull for ice-breaking. She was originally used to carry railroad cars, passengers and automobiles between the two sides of the lake all year long. Today, the ferry connects the eastern and western segments of US 10 in the two cities from May to October.

Launched September 6, 1952, SS Badger entered service March 21, 1953, for the Chesapeake and Ohio Railway (from 1973 a subsidiary of the Chessie System). The C&O had acquired the rail car ferry operations in Ludington with its acquisition of the Pere Marquette Railway in 1947. After 1972 with the advent of Amtrak, service was gradually curtailed; all but the three newest vessels were retired, and sailings to Milwaukee, Wisconsin, and Manitowoc, Wisconsin, were discontinued, leaving only the route between Ludington and Kewaunee, Wisconsin. On July 1, 1983, the Chessie System ended its car ferry service when it sold the steamers Badger, Spartan, and City of Midland 41 to Glen F. Bowden of Ludington. He organized the Michigan–Wisconsin Transportation Company (MWT) to continue the operation.

The railroad car ferry concept on Lake Michigan was facing serious economic troubles during the 1980s and by November 1988, Badger was the only vessel running. She was the last of the 14 ferries based in Ludington remaining in service. On November 16, 1990, facing bankruptcy, Bowden laid up Badger, ending 93 years of railway car ferry service out of Ludington and 98 years on Lake Michigan as a whole.

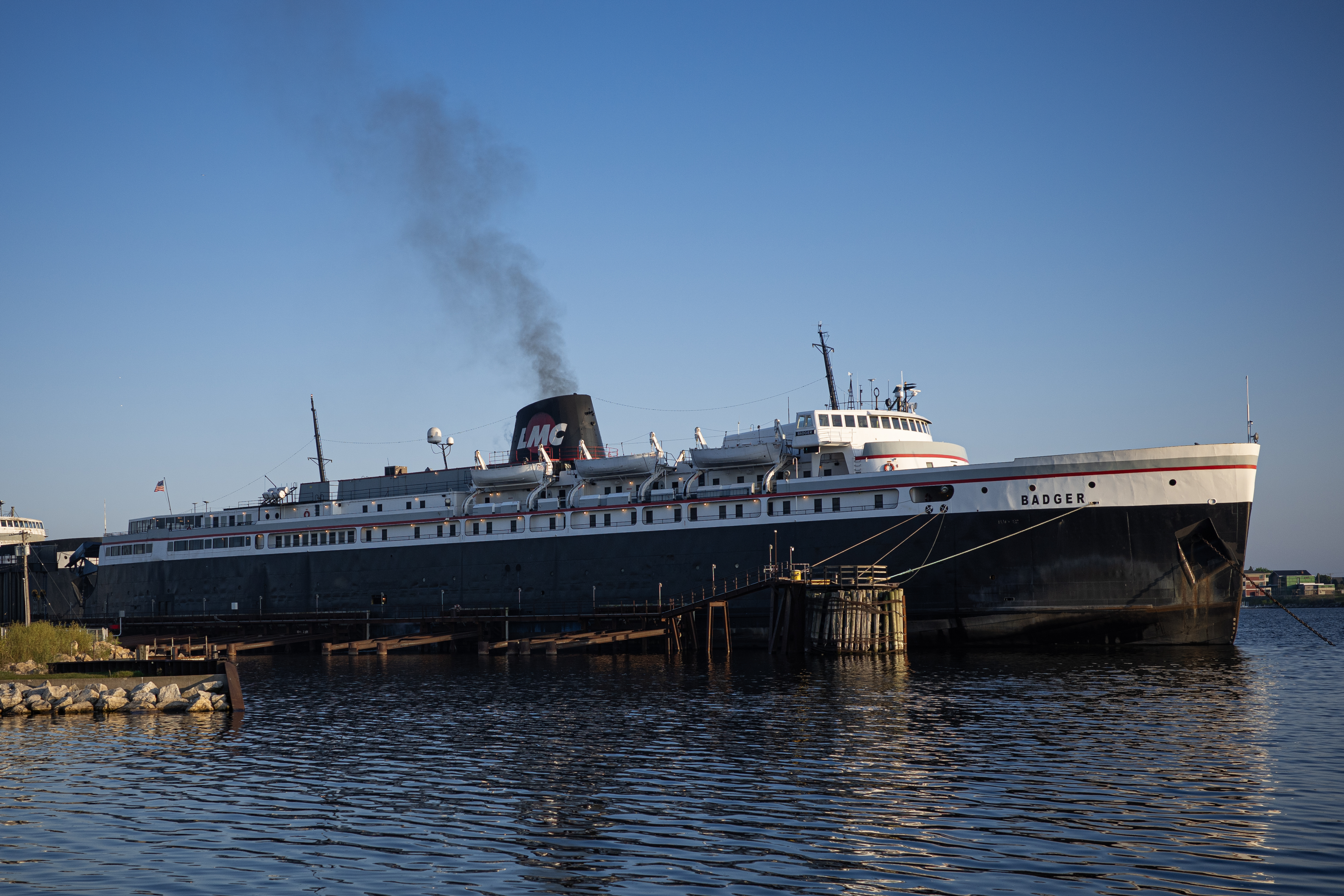
SS Badger docked at Ludington, Michigan

== Lake Michigan Carferry Service ==
Map of ferry route

After sitting idle for a year, the three ferries were purchased by entrepreneur, philanthropist, and Ludington native Charles F. Conrad of Holland, Michigan, on July 9, 1991. He undertook a major overhaul and refit of Badger exclusively for carrying passengers and automobiles. The only operating ferry of her kind in the world, the ship is an icon of car ferry heritage on the Great Lakes. Conrad retired as president of Lake Michigan Carferry Service in 1993. He died on February 9, 1995. Since 1993, the company has been headed by his son-in-law, Robert Manglitz.

Badger is the last large coal-burning steamship in the United States and is the last vessel in service on the Great Lakes to be powered by Skinner Unaflow engines (manufactured by the Skinner Company of Erie, Pennsylvania). (Note: The 1906 lake freighter SS St. Marys Challenger, another steamship still in service on Lake Michigan, also had Skinner Unaflow engines, fitted during a refit in 1950, until 2014, when it was converted into a barge. Also, the Canadian lakes steamer, James Norris, had Unaflow engines, but was retired in 2011.)

Typically, Badger completes a trip across Lake Michigan in about four hours, covering 60 miles (97 km). SS Badger rarely misses a sailing due to weather.

SS Badger is also unusual in that she is a registered historical site in two states. The Michigan Historical Commission and the Wisconsin Historical Commission each named Badger as a registered historical site in 1997. In 1996, Badger's propulsion system was designated a mechanical engineering landmark by the American Society of Mechanical Engineers. In 2002, Badger was named Ship of the Year by the Steamship Historical Society of America. The ship was listed on the National Register of Historic Places on December 11, 2009. On January 20, 2016, the National Park Service designated the ship a National Historic Landmark.

Video of SS Badger in 2015 sailing from Ludington (62 seconds)

On August 9, 2008, Badger suffered a stern bearing failure, causing the company to cancel the ferry's sailings for nearly a week. It was the first time the ship had ever experienced a stern bearing failure. On August 10, the ferry sailed under her own power to the Bay Shipbuilding yard in Sturgeon Bay, Wisconsin, for repairs. As the yard had no opening at the time for the work to be done in the dry dock, a team of divers was flown in from California to assist in the repairs. Regular sailings resumed August 15, 2008. It was the first time since 1993 (when it struck a rock at Ludington) that Badger was laid up for unscheduled repairs and the first time since 2005 that the company cancelled a sailing because of mechanical failure.

Badger's large deck space allows her to transport tractor trailers and larger commercial loads. In 2012, she carried more than 1,000 commercial loads. The ship carries wind turbine components from Wisconsin, some 150 feet (45.7 m) long and 150,000 pounds (68,000 kg). Badger's fall season was extended two weeks into early November to carry additional wind turbine loads. In 2015, the ferry was officially designated as part of US 10, thus linking the two disconnected segments of the highway.

In December 2020, Badger was sold to Interlake Steamship Company. The deal also includes the barge Pere Marquette 41 and SS Spartan. It was a part of a larger sale of assets. Interlake is based in Middleburg Heights, Ohio.

On July 21, 2023, a ramp counterweight in the ferry's Ludington terminal failed. While Badger herself was unharmed, the extensive damage and lack of an alternate loading ramp forced an early end to the ferry's 2023 season. Service resumed on May 17, 2024, after a new counterweight system was installed at the Ludington dock.

On September 17, 2025, the Badger experienced an engine malfunction and had a collision with the Spartan while backing into the dock, damaging the sea gate located on the stern. Overnight, the sea gate was removed, the ship received a maintenance review and the Badger continued operations the following day. Over the winter months, the sea gate of the Spartan was used to replace the damaged sea gate of the Badger.

== Environmental impact ==
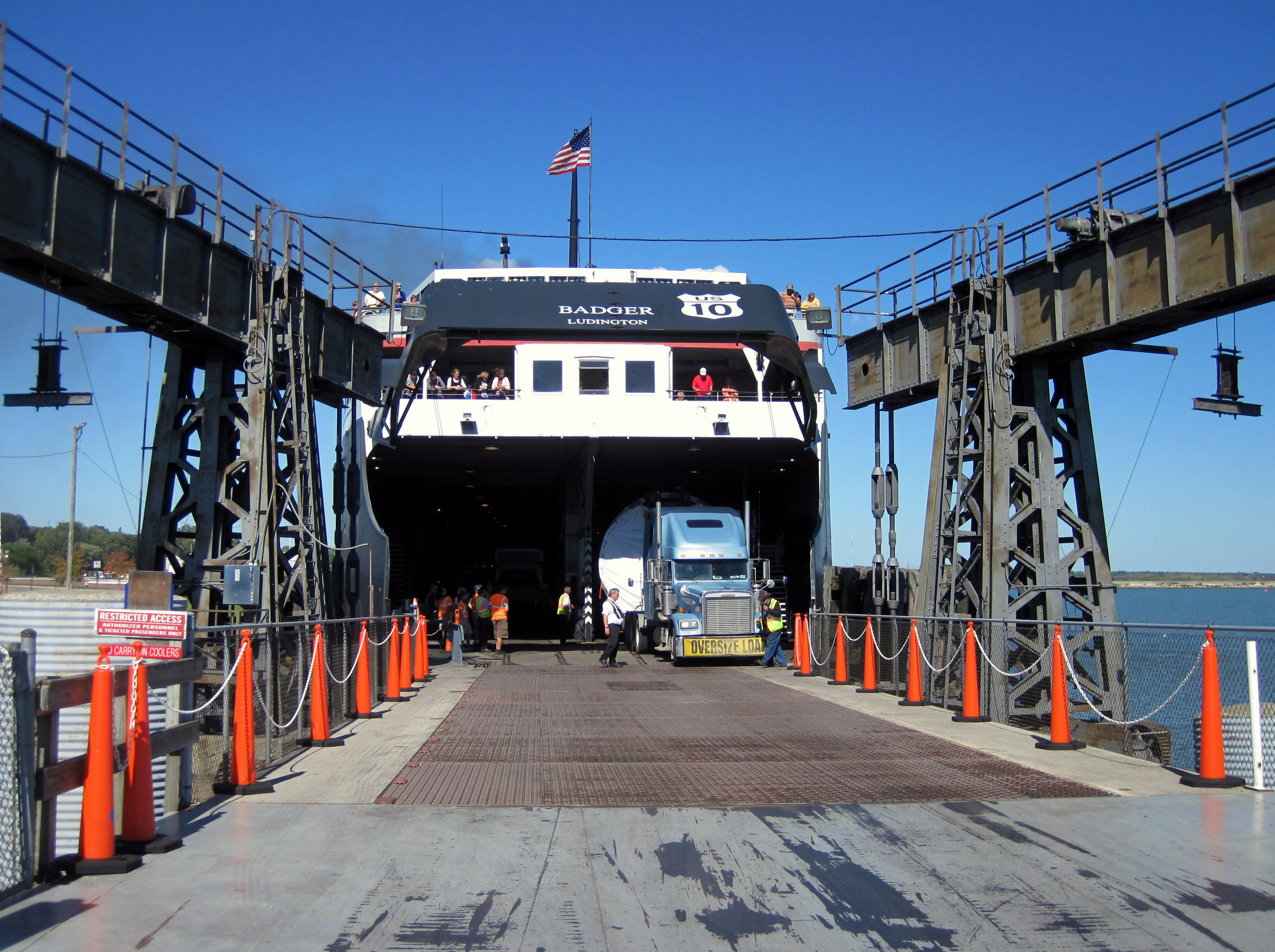
A wind turbine being loaded onto the ferry

SS Badger came under fire from the Environmental Protection Agency (EPA) and environmental groups in late 2008 because of her daily practice of dumping untreated coal ash from her boilers directly into the waters of Lake Michigan. Burning 55 short tons (49 long tons; 50 t) of coal a day produces 4 short tons (3.57 long tons; 3.63 t) of ash. Coal ash is a byproduct of Badger's propulsion system.

Badger had earlier been the subject of EPA Clean Air action, but was granted an exemption under the law due to her historical significance as a coal-fired, steam-powered vessel. Company officials compared coal ash to "harmless sand" and planned to keep Badger in her original coal-burning configuration. In an effort to continue to minimize the environmental impact to the lake, the Lake Michigan Carferry had explored a number of alternatives, including storing the ash on board and unloading upon arrival in Ludington. Another option once considered was the use of compressed natural gas, which would allow the historical boiler system to be maintained and make SS Badger the first "green" ship on the Great Lakes.

Lake Michigan Carferry signed a consent decree with the United States Department of Justice and the EPA in March 2013 to end ash discharge within two years, using a new ash-retention system. The revised consent decree was filed in September 2013. In January 2015, work began on a conveyor system that will store ash in four containment bins on board. A new combustion-control system will allow the ship to be more efficient by burning less coal and generating less ash. Badger was retrofitted so that she will no longer discharge ash into the lake, and has been certified to return to service. The ash is now off-loaded and used to make cement.

== See also ==
- U.S. Highway 10
  - In Michigan
  - In Wisconsin
- Ferries in Michigan
  - HSC Lake Express
- Maritime Metro Transit
