= SS City of Midland 41 =

Train ferry launched in 1941

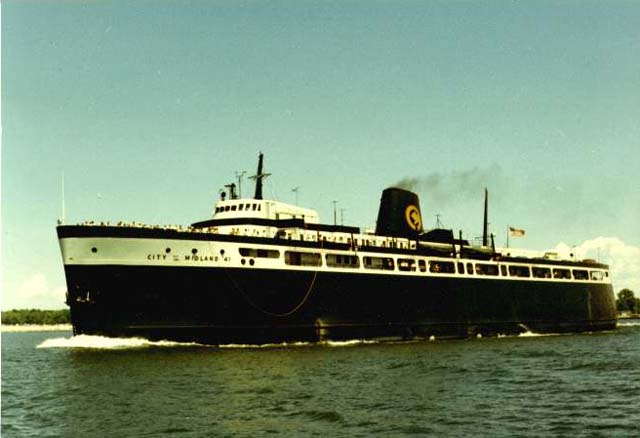
- SS City of Midland 41 leaving Ludington in July 1976

History

United States
- Name: City of Midland 41
- Namesake: Midland, Michigan
- Operator: Pere Marquette Railway (1941–1947); Chesapeake and Ohio Railway (1947–1983); Michigan-Wisconsin Transportation Company (1983–1988)
- Port of registry: Ludington, Michigan
- Route: Ludington, Michigan – Milwaukee, Wisconsin, Ludington to Manitowoc, Wisconsin, Ludington to Kewaunee, Wisconsin
- Builder: Manitowoc Shipbuilding Company
- Cost: $ 1.75 million
- Yard number: Hull number 311
- Launched: September 18, 1940
- Completed: March 1941
- Maiden voyage: March 12, 1941
- Out of service: November 1988
- Identification: Official No. 240326; IMO number: 5073894
- Nickname(s): Queen of the Lakes
- Fate: Cut to barge in 1997

General characteristics
- Type: Train ferry
- Tonnage: 3,968 gross tons
- Length: 406 ft (123.75 m)
- Beam: 58.2 ft (17.74 m)
- Installed power: Steam (Coal-fired)
- Propulsion: Two Skinner Engine Company Unaflow engines
- Speed: 18 mph (15.6 kn; 29.0 km/h)
- Capacity: 72 staterooms, 50 automobiles, 34 freight cars on four tracks

SS City of Midland 41 was a train ferry serving the ports of Ludington, Michigan, Milwaukee, Wisconsin, Manitowoc, Wisconsin, and Kewaunee, Wisconsin, for the Pere Marquette Railway and its successor, the Chesapeake and Ohio Railway from 1941 until 1988. The ferry was named after the city of Midland, Michigan.

== Railroad car ferry ==
The vessel was built by Manitowoc Shipbuilding Company in 1940 at a cost of $1.75 million. One of the last coal-burning car ferries on Lake Michigan, she entered service for the Pere Marquette Railway company in March 1941 as the largest Great Lakes ferry. Powered by two Skinner Unaflow steam engines, City of Midland 41 was capable of speeds up to 20 miles per hour (17.4 kn) with a cruising speed of 17.6 miles per hour (15.3 kn).

The City of Midland 41 was unique for car ferries in that she also contained many amenities for the automobile and passenger traffic that crossed the lake in the warmer summer months. She had an extra passenger deck compared to the other ferries of her time, and frequently would run the Ludington–Manitowoc route during the busy summer months, serving as a moving connector of U.S. Highway 10. Because of her exemplary amenities as well as her size and aesthetic silhouette she was nicknamed the "Queen of the Lakes".

In addition to transporting railroad cars through the World War II years, City of Midland 41 also served as a training vessel for United States Coast Guard (USCG) and United States Navy enlisted sailors, since the vessel's Unaflow engines were similar to those used aboard the Casablanca-class escort carriers.

In 1947 the Pere Marquette Railway was acquired and its assets, including City of Midland 41, merged into the Chesapeake and Ohio Railway (C&O). During the late 1940s through the 1960s City of Midland 41 experienced the prime years of her career. In 1952 and 1953, the car ferries SS Pere Marquette 21 and SS Pere Marquette 22 were upgraded, and two new car ferries, SS Spartan and SS Badger, entered service. They were the last two railroad car ferries built on the Great Lakes.

== Barge conversion ==
By the mid-1970s, the C&O was seeking to abandon its car ferry routes. Many of the older ferries, including Pere Marquette 21 and Pere Marquette 22, were retired and sold for scrap, leaving only Spartan, Badger, and City of Midland 41 as the last three ferries operating. In 1979 Spartan was laid up at Ludington, leaving only two ferries still in operation.

In 1983, the C&O completed the abandonment of its car ferry routes and the three vessels were purchased by Glen Bowden and George Towns, who formed the Michigan-Wisconsin Transportation Company (M-WT). This venture, while keeping the ferries running, was doomed to fail almost from the start. Increased labor costs, combined with improved rail and highway routes through Chicago, rendered the ferries obsolete. In 1987, USCG inspections showed that the boiler mounts on City of Midland 41 had deteriorated and needed replacement, however these repairs were waived for a year.

Rather than losing the only ferry in service (Badger had been laid up in 1984), M-WT opted to refurbish Badger, and in 1988 City of Midland 41 made her last voyage in November of that year. She was laid-up in Ludington's No. 2 1/2 slip. She sat rusting in the harbor for nine years before her fate was decided. After a 47-year career in which she carried approximately 1 million railroad cars and sailed 3.5 million miles, it was determined that City of Midland 41 would be converted to a barge. She was towed out of Ludington harbor on October 1, 1997, and had her superstructure reduced in Muskegon by November 7.

City of Midland 41 is now operating as the deck barge Pere Marquette 41, that makes its home port at Ludington. The barge is part of an integrated tug/barge pair with the historic tugboat MT Undaunted. The tug is almost as old as the ferry, built for the United States Navy as ATA 199 in 1944. The tug was renamed Undaunted when it worked for the National Oceanic and Atmospheric Administration briefly in 1963 before serving at the U.S. Merchant Marine Academy until 1993. From 1993 until 1998, the tug worked on the Great Lakes as Krystal K. before being renamed Undaunted and altered for integrated tug work. A man died in an accident on the barge in November 2013.

== Sale ==
In December 2020, the barge, along with Badger, was sold to Interlake Steamship Company. The deal also "includes acquisition of ... the SS Spartan, a sister ship to the Badger that's currently not in operation." It was a part of a larger sale of assets. The "Middleburg Heights, Ohio-based Interlake Holding Co. acquired the assets of Ludington-based Lake Michigan Car Ferry Co., the owner and operator of Badger, according to a statement. The deal also included the assets of Ludington-based Pere Marquette Shipping Co., which included the 'workhorse' articulated tug-barge Undaunted-Pere Marquette 41."

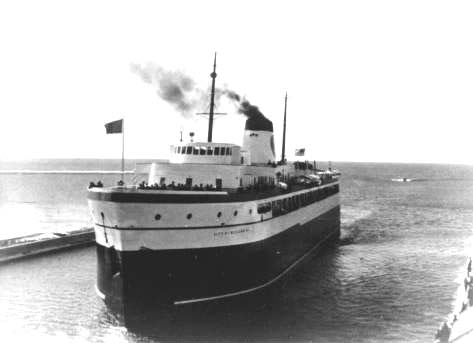
City of Midland 41 on her maiden voyage

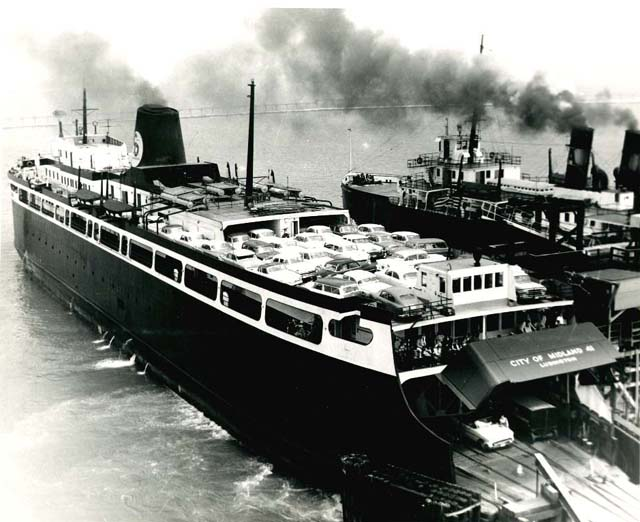
City of Midland 41 docked at Manitowoc, Wisconsin c. 1950s. Notice City of Midland 41's large automobile capacity.

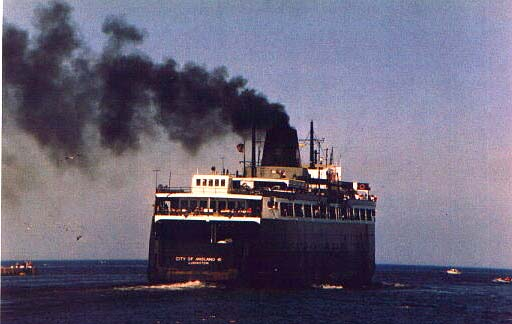
City of Midland 41 sailing out of Ludington in July 1988, the last year she would ever sail as a ferry.

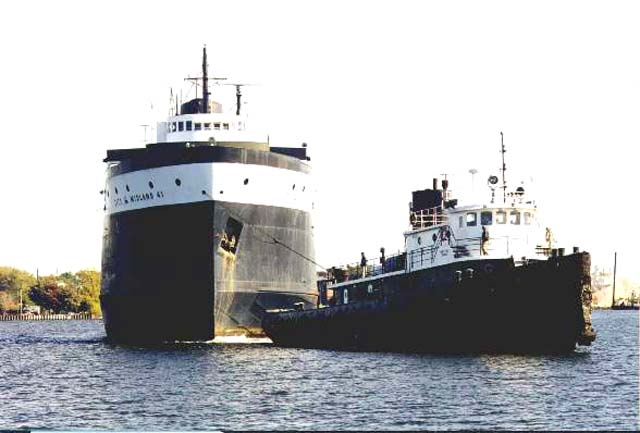
City of Midland 41 being towed out of Ludington to be converted into a tug barge, October 1997
