= USS Undaunted (ATA-199) =

Tugboat of the United States Navy

History

United States
- Name: USS Undaunted (ATA-199) (b. Kings Pointer, c. Krystal K)
- Operator: Interlake Steamship Company (1998–present)
- Port of registry: Ludington, Michigan
- Builder: Gulfport Boiler and Welding Works, Port Arthur, Texas
- Laid down: 27 November 1943
- Launched: 22 August 1944
- Commissioned: USS ATA-199, 29 October 1944
- Decommissioned: 1947
- Renamed: Undaunted (ATA-199), 16 July 1948
- Reclassified: Auxiliary Ocean Tug ATA 199, 15 May 1944
- Stricken: January 1963
- Fate: Transferred to NOAA in 1963
- Refit: 1998
- Identification: IMO number: 8963210; MMSI number: 366780000; Callsign: WDB8103
- Status: In service on the Great Lakes

General characteristics
- Class & type: Sotoyomo-class tugboat
- Displacement: 534 t.Long tons 835 t. Full load
- Length: 143 ft (44 m)
- Beam: 33 ft (10 m)
- Draft: 13 ft (4.0 m)
- Propulsion: as built (2)General Motors Cleveland Diesel Engine Division model 12-278a diesel engines, electric propulsion motor, single screw
- Speed: 13 knots (24 km/h; 15 mph)
- Complement: 45 (Navy) 9-12 (civilian)
- Armament: 1 × single 3"/50 caliber gun mount; 2 × single 20 mm AA gun mounts

The second USS Undaunted was laid down as rescue tug ATR-126 on 27 November 1943 at Port Arthur, Texas, by the Gulfport Boiler and Welding Works; reclassified auxiliary ocean tug ATA-199 on 15 May 1944; launched on 22 August 1944; and commissioned on 20 October 1944.

Following shakedown out of Galveston, ATA-199 paused briefly at New Orleans on 18 November, then put to sea the same day to rendezvous with a convoy bound for the Panama Canal with sections of an advance base dock ABSD-5 in tow. ATA-199 acted as retriever tug for the convoy and, on the 22d, took over a tow from a tug which had broken down. Arriving at the Canal Zone on the 29th, she spent over two weeks as a member of Service Squadron 2, pulling various units through the locks. On the 21st, she departed the Canal Zone again acting as the retriever tug for a Philippine-bound convoy, steamed via the Marshall Islands and Caroline Islands, and arrived at Leyte on 24 February 1945.

She operated in Leyte Gulf until 23 March when she departed Pedro Bay towing fleet ocean tug Serrano (ATF-112). She arrived at Ulithi four days later and joined Service Squadron 10. In the months that followed she operated in the Philippines, Marianas, Carolines, Solomons, and Admiralties towing vessels that varied from lighters to wrecking derricks. In June and July, she towed pontoon barges from the Russell Islands to Okinawa; then on the morning of 29 July, she departed Buckner Bay and headed for the west coast, with the battered destroyer, USS Hugh W. Hadley (DD-774), in tow. During her homeward voyage—as she proceeded via Saipan, Eniwetok, and Pearl Harbor—Japan capitulated. The tug weathered a typhoon before reaching San Francisco on 26 September, at the end of a tow of nearly 7,000 miles.

Exactly one month later, she got underway again and returned to Pearl Harbor early in November. ATA-199 operated out of Oahu until 11 April 1946, when she departed Pearl Harbor, with a section of ABSD-7 in tow, and proceeded—via west coast ports and the Panama Canal—to Norfolk, Virginia where she delivered her tow on 21 July. She remained there until 24 August when she set her course via Panama City, Florida, and, on 7 September, arrived at New Orleans. Operating from that base, she conducted tows between various gulf ports until 24 June 1947 when she arrived at Beaumont, Texas, for inactivation overhaul.

On 25 August 1947, she proceeded to Orange, Tex., where she was decommissioned the same day and assigned to the Texas Group, Atlantic Reserve Fleet. The tug was named Undaunted on 16 July 1948 and transferred to the custody of the Maritime Administration—although still owned by the Navy—in September 1961. By January 1963, her name was struck from the Navy list. She was later transferred to the Bureau of Commercial Fisheries. She was then loaned as a training vessel to the US Merchant Marine Academy at Kings Point, NY and renamed the TV Kings Pointer. In 1993 the Kings Pointer was sold to basic Towing of Escanaba, MI and was renamed the Krystal K. In 1998 the vessel was sold again to Pere Marquette Shipping of Ludington, MI for use as a push tug for their 400 ft (120 m) bulk barge Pere Marquette 41. The Krystal K was rebuilt as an articulated pusher tug and received a Hydraconn connection system and an elevated pilot house. Upon completion the tug was given her original name of Undaunted. The MT Undaunted is still in service to this day on the Great Lakes.
