= Ralph Frese =

Ralph Frese (1926-2012) was an American canoe maker and conservationist Known as "Mr. Canoe", he was known for promoting conservation and canoeing, building historic replica canoes (including large ones), and starting canoeing and conservation organizations and events. He was known as "Mr. Canoe". Frese was also a fourth-generation blacksmith, operating in a building next to his Chicagoland Canoe Base store in Chicago and was said to probably have been the last blacksmith working in Chicago.

== Life ==
In a 2008 interview, Frese told the Chicago Tribune that his "first boat was a canvas kayak he bought for $15 when he was 14 years old. From then on, he spent time paddling Chicago-area rivers and extolling the virtues of riverbank wilderness."

In the early 1950s, Frese founded the Illinois Paddling Council. In the 1950s Frese began building canoes.

He started the (Chicago area) Des Plaines River Marathon in 1958. Now called the DesPlaines River Canoe & Kayak Marathon, it is the second oldest continuously held canoe race in the United States."

Ralph was a founding board member and lifelong supporter of the Chicago Maritime Society and supportive of its efforts to build the Chicago Maritime Museum to fully tell Chicago maritime history.

He also started the (Chicago area) New Year's Day Canoe Paddle which was in its 27th year as of 2012.

He built replica Birch bark canoes out of fiberglass, including for Voyageurs National Park. Bill Derrah said that he met a person in Mississippi who built large canoes for the Mississippi River who learned how to build them from Frese. John Ruskey of Clarksdale Mississippi is building 30 foot Voyager style canoes based on a design he was given by Frese.

Frese's lifelong work served as the inspiration for the 2018 documentary Mr. Canoe, which made its debut on January 26, 2018. The Chicago Maritime Museum, which screened the documentary, describes it as "the incredible story of Ralph Frese, the inspirational Instigator behind countless canoe journeys through the heart of the country. Experience the inside story from his many canoe disciples, Including the epic 3,000 mile historic journey from Montreal to New Orleans. Ralph was a Chicagoan, an American, but above all he embodied the name he was known as around the world: Mr. Canoe."

Francis Benton - British adventurer, photographer and explorer built his little kayak at Chicagoland Canoe Base before his second trip across the ocean. Also Francis Brenton's dugout canoe "Sierra Sagrada" was stored at Ralph's store, now part of Chicago Maritime Society canoe collection.

"In the 1970s, Frese motivated peers to undertake the longest canoe journeys in more than 300 years by re-enacting two late 17th century voyages: one by Jesuit missionary Jacques Marquette and fur trader Louis Joliet, and another by French explorers René-Robert Cavelier and Sieur de La Salle. Prodded by Frese, a crew of about 20 men spent nine months canoeing 3,300 miles from the Atlantic Ocean to the Gulf of Mexico in 34-foot canoes and handmade clothing with little modern equipment."

Frese was married to Rita and had 5 children.

=== Chicagoland Canoe Base ===
Frese was also a fourth-generation blacksmith, operating in a building next to his Chicagoland Canoe Base store at 4019 N. Narragansett Ave. in Chicago which was razed in 2017. He built the Chicagoland Canoe Base onto his family's blacksmith shop. He made tools for sculptors and stonemasons. Larry Suffredin, Cook County Forest Preserve District Board commissioner said "He may have been the last blacksmith working in Chicago"

== Death ==
Frese died on December 10, 2012.

== Awards and recognitions ==
Frese was inducted into the Illinois Outdoor Hall of Fame in 2006.

The forest preserve district of Cook County, Illinois (the county containing Chicago) designated a section of the North Branch of the Chicago River the Ralph Frese River Trail. It goes from Dempster Street in Morton Grove to Willow Road in Northfield.

He received a Legends of Paddling award from the American Canoe Association.
