= Valerie van Heest =

American author, explorer and museum exhibit designer

- Born: Valerie Olson; Wilmette, Illinois, U.S.
- Occupations: Author, explorer, museum exhibit designer
- Writing career
- Years active: 2005–present
- Genre: Narrative nonfiction
- Website: valerievanheest.com

Valerie Olson van Heest is an American author, explorer, and museum exhibit designer. She is the co-founder of the Michigan Shipwreck Research Association.

== Early life ==
Van Heest was born in Wilmette, Illinois. She graduated from New Trier East High School. Her father, Robert V. Olson, was the son a of Swedish immigrant, who volunteered at 17 to join the U.S. Navy at the outbreak of WW II. Robert was a boatswain's mate and Underwater Demolition Team diver in the Pacific Theater. After the war, he encouraged his longtime friend and neighbor Sam Davison to start the Davison Corporation to manufacture scuba gear. At age 16, Valerie began working at the Dacor factory making scuba gear, and became a certified scuba diver through the company's training program.

She attended Harrington College of Design in Chicago and Loyola University and graduated with a B.A. in Interior Design. She worked at several architectural firms as a designer and project manager in Chicago.

== Career ==
In Chicago, van Heest joined the Chicago Maritime Museum dive group, and co-founded an offshoot organization, the Underwater Archaeological Society of Chicago. She served as its president for eight years. During that time, she led investigations of over a dozen shipwrecks, and testified in the Lady Elgin case, regarding her observations conducting an investigation of three sites of wreckage strewn on the lake bottom.

She co-authored reports on the shipwrecks Lady Elgin, Goshawk, and Wells Burt, and created archaeological site drawings on over a dozen shipwrecks.

After relocating to Holland, Michigan, van Heest joined the committee to establish the Southwest Michigan Underwater Preserve. In 2000, the state of Michigan approved this as the tenth underwater preserve.

Soon thereafter, van Heest, her husband Jack, Craig Rich, Geoffrey Reynolds, and others founded the Michigan Shipwreck Research Association, to research, explore, document, and interpret shipwrecks of Lake Michigan. She is currently its co-director.

In 2006, van Heest was inducted into the Women Divers Hall of Fame for her years of preserving and interpreting Great Lakes shipwrecks.

In 2007, the Historical Society of Michigan gave her the State History Award for distinguished volunteer service in promoting Michigan's submerged maritime heritage.

After their collaboration on the book Buckets and Belts in 2009, co-authors William Lafferty and van Heest formed the museum exhibit design firm Lafferty van Heest and Associates.

At its annual event in Bowling Green, Ohio, International Legends of Diving added Van Heest to its honor roll in 2010.

In 2017, van Heest received the Joyce S. Hayward Award for Historic Interpretation from the Association for Great Lakes Maritime History.

=== Literary career ===
Van Heest has written articles for magazines and historical journals. including Michigan History, Wreck Diving Magazine, The Great Laker, and Inland Seas.

Van Heest began writing her first book in 2005. The recent MSRA discovery of the S.S. Michigan inspired her to share this story with her daughters by writing a young reader's book, for which she also created the artwork.

After receiving an award from the Historical Society of Michigan for her first book, Icebound! The Adventures of Young George Sheldon and the SS Michigan, she began writing non-fiction books about Great Lakes shipwrecks and other historical topics.

Van Heest worked with NUMA's Clive Cussler during the search for NWA Flight 2501. In 2006, he encouraged her to write a book about that aircraft tragedy. Fatal Crossing was published in 2013. Cussler's blurb appears on the cover.

=== Michigan Shipwreck Research Association ===
Van Heest is a co-founder of the Michigan Shipwreck Research Associates, a 501(c)3 non-profit corporation. Its mission is to preserve and interpret Michigan's submerged maritime history. The organization conducts side-scan sonar expeditions in search of shipwrecks and aircraft wrecks in Lake Michigan. Board members research and document submerged cultural resources, and create educational resources including its website and newsletter, documentary films, informative articles, books, and museum exhibits. Its board of directors makes presentations to various organizations. Since 1998, MSRA hosts an annual public symposium to showcase its projects and those of other Great Lakes explorers.

Van Heest has been a leading member in the annual search expeditions in lower Lake Michigan, which have discovered shipwrecks including the H.C. Akeley, SS Michigan, Hennepin, John V. Moran, Milwaukee, Hattie Wells, and William Tell.

== Personal life ==
Van Heest has been married to Jack van Heest since 1995. The couple has two daughters, both certified scuba divers. They live in Holland, Michigan.

== Bibliography ==
| Title | Publication date | Awards |
|---|---|---|
| Icebound! The Adventures of Young George Sheldon and the SS Michigan | 2008 | 2009 Michigan State History Award |
| Buckets and Belts: Evolution of the Great Lakes Self-Unloader^{*} | 2009 | 2009 Michigan State History Award |
| Lost on the Lady Elgin | 2010 | 1st place INDIE New Generation Award |
| Unsolved Mysteries: The Shipwreck Thomas Hume | 2011 | |
| Lost & Found: Legendary Lake Michigan Shipwrecks | 2012 | |
| Fatal Crossing: The Mysterious Disappearance of NWA Flight 2501and the Quest for Answers (2013) | 2013 | 2014 IPPY Award |
| Big Red Lighthouse: The Illustrated History of Holland Michigan's Famous Lighthouse | 2024 | |

(*) indicates book co-authored with William Lafferty.

== Documentaries ==
On behalf of the Michigan Shipwreck Research Association, van Heest wrote or co-wrote and contributed to the production of the following shipwreck documentaries, which she also presented at MSRA's annual "Mysteries & Histories Beneath the Inland Seas" event in Holland, Michigan.

| Title | Publication date |
|---|---|
| The Verano: A Porthole to the Past | 1999 |
| A Glimpse Into the Past: The Discovery of the H.C. Akeley | 2002 |
| The Disappearance of Flight 2501 | 2004 |
| Icebound Found: The Ordeal of the S.S. Michigan | 2005 |
| Planes, Trains, and Ships | 2007 |
| She Died a Hard Death: The Sinking of the Hennepin | 2007 |
| Freshwater Monsoon | 2008 |
| Raising the Alvin Clark: Forty Years of Perspective | 2009 |
| A Tale of Two Schooners | 2010 |
| Lost on the Lady Elgin | 2011 |
| Unsolved Mysteries: The Shipwreck Thomas Hume | 2012 |

These programs were also presented at various annual underwater film festivals all around the Great Lakes, including:

- Our World Underwater, Chicago, Illinois
- Ford Seahorses' Great Lakes Shipwreck Festival. Ann Arbor, Michigan
- Great Lakes Shipwreck Research Foundation's Ghost Ships Festival. Milwaukee, Wisconsin
- Bay Area Diver's Shipwreck and Scuba, Sandusky, Ohio
- The Niagara Divers' Association Annual Shipwrecks Symposium, Shipwrecks, Welland, Ontario
- Lake Superior Marine Museum Association's Gales of November, Duluth, Minnesota
