= Ida Beav Wells =

Beaver in Chicago

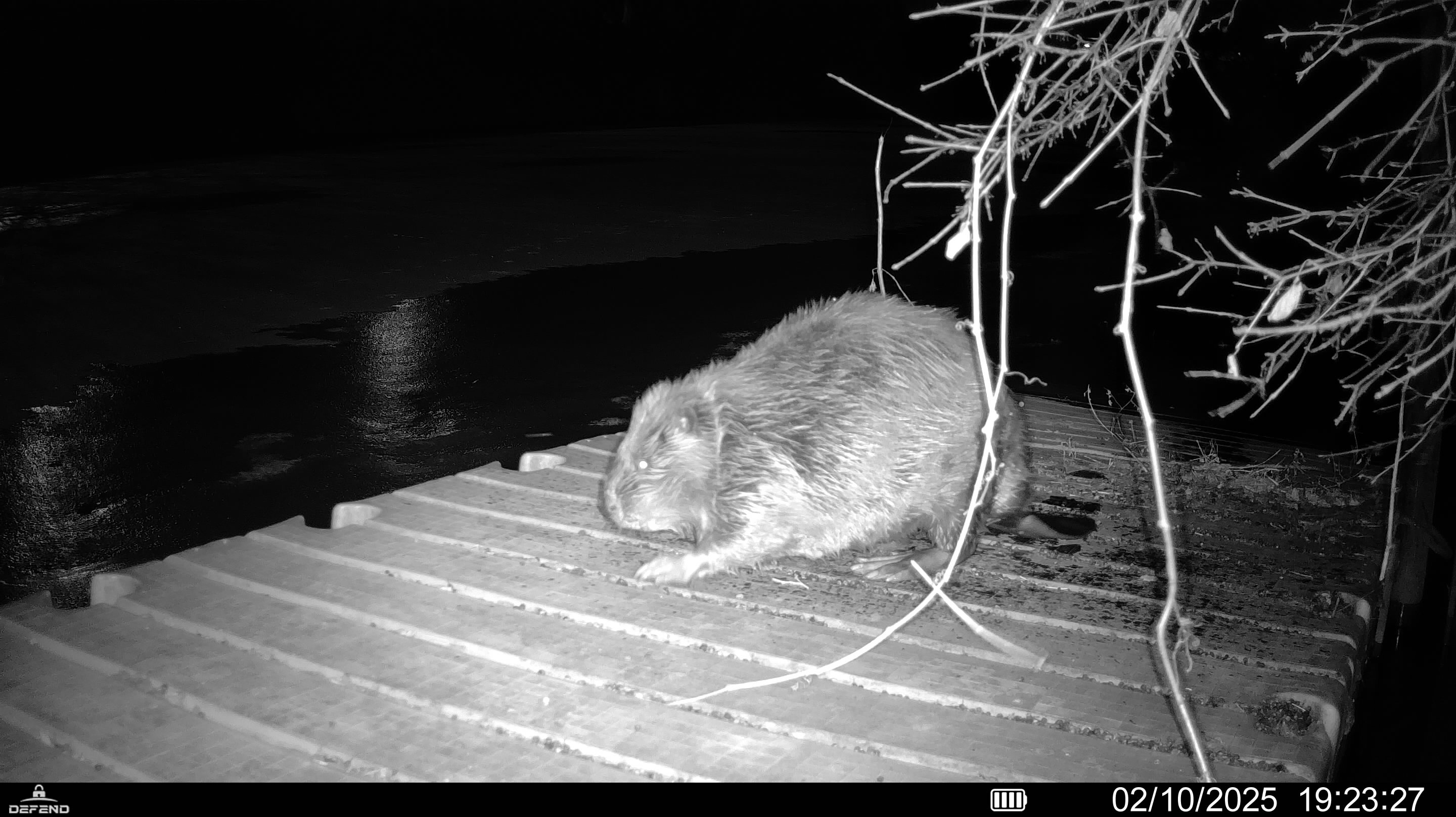
- Ida Beav Wells caught on a trail cam
- Species: North American beaver
- Sex: Female
- Residence: Bubbly Creek, Chicago

Ida Beav Wells is a North American beaver that lives in the Southwest Side of Chicago, Illinois near Bubbly Creek. The name was the result of a naming competition held by Urban Rivers. She is particularly known for her "remarkably rotund" appearance. After going viral online, her name was selected through a public contest. Her presence is considered a positive indicator of the improving health of the Chicago River.

== Discovery and public attention ==
The beaver was first observed in the South Branch of the Chicago River in the Bridgeport neighborhood on the city's South Side. Local nonprofit Urban Rivers captured video of the beaver on a trail camera and posted the video to Reddit. She quickly gained viral fame online, where she was affectionately described as a "massive beaver" and "remarkably rotund." This large size led to public speculation that she might be pregnant.

== Naming contest ==
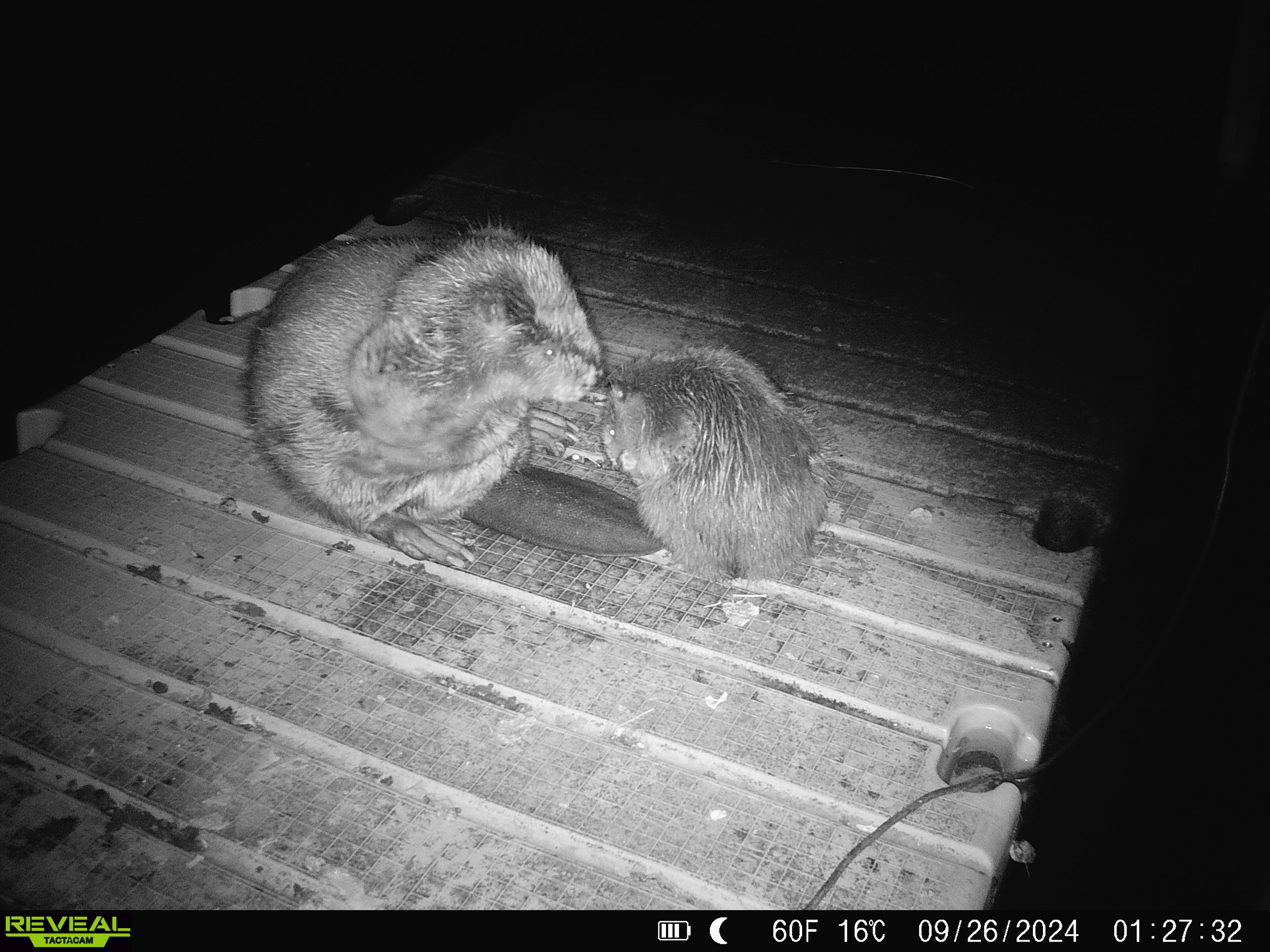
Ida Beav Wells' child, Plumpton Sinclair was named after Upton Sinclair as her habitat is located on Bubbly Creek, which is discussed in The Jungle

After the beaver became a local phenomenon, a contest was launched to officially name her. On March 13, 2025, the winning name was announced as Ida Beav Wells. The name is a pun honoring the historic Chicago journalist, activist, and civil rights leader Ida B. Wells. The two runner up names, Chewy Garcia, and Plumpton Sinclair, were assigned to her children.

== Habitat ==
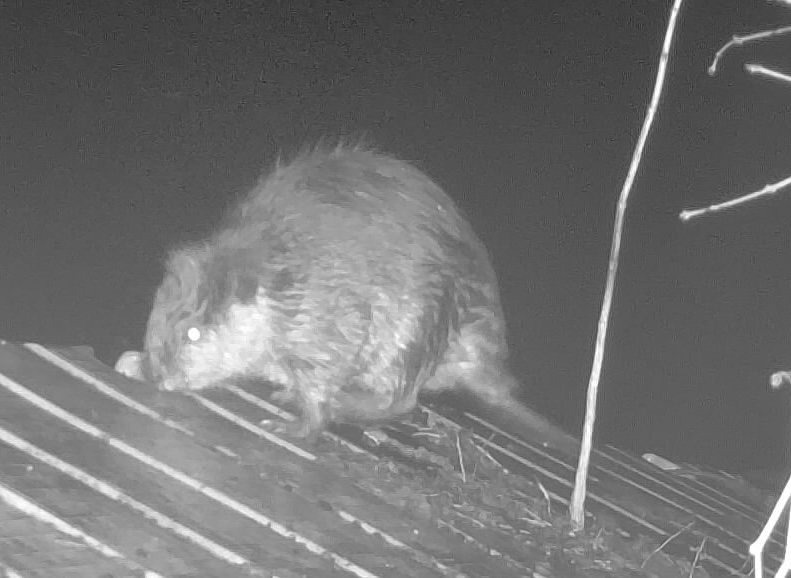
Ida Beav Wells' youngest child, named Chewy Garcia after Chuy García

Ida Beav Wells's home is in Bubbly Creek, a fork of the South Branch of the Chicago River. The presence of wildlife like beavers in this specific waterway is significant, as Bubbly Creek was once infamous for severe water pollution by local industrial waste as well as sewage overflow from increased rainfall. The waterway has since undergone cleanup efforts, and the ability of a beaver to thrive there is seen as an encouraging sign of the river's ecological recovery.

== See also ==
- List of individual animals
