= UASC =

UASC may refer to:

- Unaccompanied asylum-seeking children in the United Kingdom
- Underwater Archaeological Society of Chicago
- United Arab Shipping Company, merged with Hapag-Lloyd in April 2016
- Universal Avionics Systems Corporation, aka Universal Avionics
