= SS John V. Moran =

American package freighter

Coordinates: 43.163367°N 86.685653°W

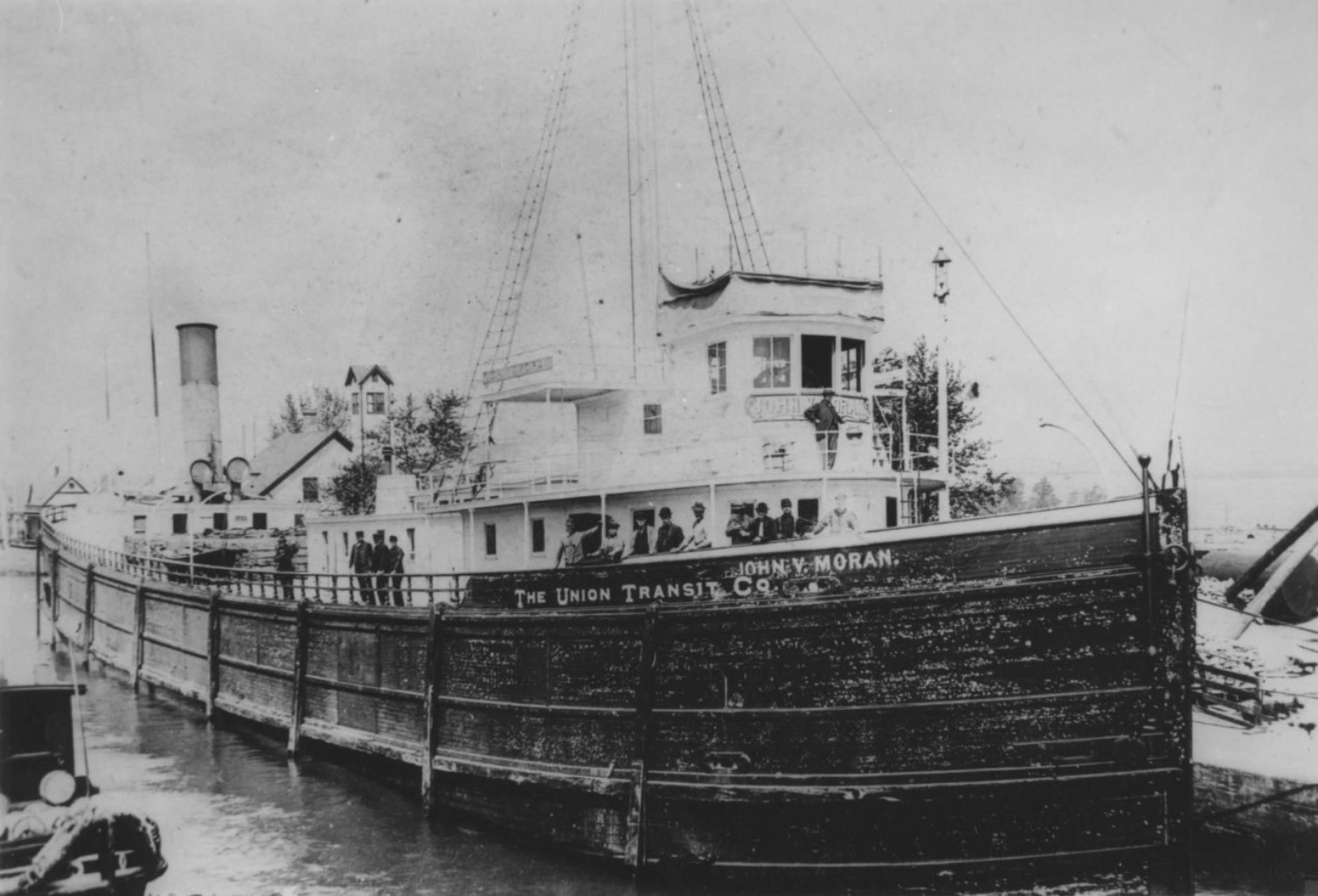
- John V. Moran before she sank

History

United States
- Name: John V. Moran
- Operator: Crosby Transportation Company of Milwaukee, Wisconsin
- Port of registry: Buffalo, New York
- Builder: F.W. Wheeler & Company of West Bay City, Michigan
- Yard number: 44
- Launched: August 16, 1888
- In service: August 1888
- Out of service: February 12, 1899
- Identification: Registry number US 76748
- Fate: Holed by ice, and sank on Lake Michigan
- Wreck discovered: July 8, 2015

General characteristics
- Class & type: Package freighter
- Tonnage: 1,350.38 GRT; 1,035.26 NRT
- Length: 214 feet (65 m)
- Beam: 37 feet (11 m)
- Depth: 22.16 feet (6.75 m)
- Installed power: Engine: 1 × 500 hp (370 kW) 82 rpm fore and aft compound steam engine; Boiler: 1 × 110 pounds per square inch (760 kPa) Scotch marine boiler
- Propulsion: 1 × fixed pitch propeller
- Crew: 24

SS John V. Moran was a wooden-hulled American package freighter in service between 1888 and 1899. She was built in 1888 in West Bay City, Michigan, by F.W. Wheeler & Company. She was built for Ward's Crescent Transportation Company of Detroit, Michigan, and was operated as part of his Detroit & Lake Superior Line. She was built to haul both bulk, and package freight. Throughout the 1893 shipping season, John V. Moran ran between Buffalo, New York, and Duluth, Minnesota. She was sold for the first time in 1895 to the Union Transit Line of Buffalo, and once again in 1898 to the Crosby Transportation Company of Milwaukee, Wisconsin.

On February 9, 1899, John V. Moran was bound from Milwaukee to Muskegon, Michigan, with a cargo of barreled flour and various package goods, when a piece of ice cut a hole in her hull, causing water to leak in on Lake Michigan. Her crew alerted the nearby steamer Naomi using John V. Moran's whistle. Three of John V. Moran's crew walked across the ice to Naomi. Upon receiving the crew of John V. Moran, Naomi headed over to John V. Moran and removed the rest of her crew. On February 10, Naomi took John V. Moran in tow, but she was leaking too badly to make it to Muskegon. On the morning of February 11, John V. Moran's crew walked back to her across the ice in order to retrieve everything of value on board. Her crew arrived at Grand Haven, Michigan, the following night. The John V. Moran was still afloat on February 12, having been sighted by the ferry Muskegon who was on her way to Muskegon. She sank without loss of life the same day.

The wreck of John V. Moran was discovered on July 8, 2015, more than 116 years after her sinking by the Michigan Shipwreck Research Association, who called her "the most intact steamship wreck on the bottom of Lake Michigan, if not all of the Great Lakes".

== History ==
=== Design and construction ===
John V. Moran (US official number 76748) was built in 1888 in West Bay City, Michigan, by F.W. Wheeler & Company. John V. Moran was the last of three sister ships built between 1886 and 1888. Her sister ships were William H. Stevens (1886) and Eber Ward (1888).

Her wooden hull was 214 feet (65 m) long, 37 feet (11 m) wide and 22.16 ft (6.75 m) deep. She had a gross tonnage of 1350.38 tons and a net tonnage of 1035.26 tons.

She was powered by a two-cylinder 500 hp (370 kW) 82 rpm fore and aft compound steam engine; the cylinders of the engine were 26 inches (66 cm) and 48 inches (120 cm) in diameter, and had a stroke of 40 inches (100 cm). Steam for the engine was produced by a single 12 foot (3.7 m) × 12.5 foot (3.8 m) 110 pounds per square inch (760 kPa) Scotch marine boiler. The engine was manufactured by Samuel F. Hodge & Company in Detroit, Michigan, while the boiler was manufactured by the Lake Erie Boiler Works in Buffalo, New York. She was propelled by a single fixed pitch propeller. It was 14.3 inches (36.3 cm) in diameter, and had an 11 inch (27.9 cm) pitch.

John V. Moran was a combination of a bulk freighter and a package freighter, built to carry both bulk (e.g. iron ore, coal) and package freight (e.g. flour). As such, she had cargo hatches in her deck, and her sides. Her hull was reinforced with iron plates for winter transit.

=== Service history ===
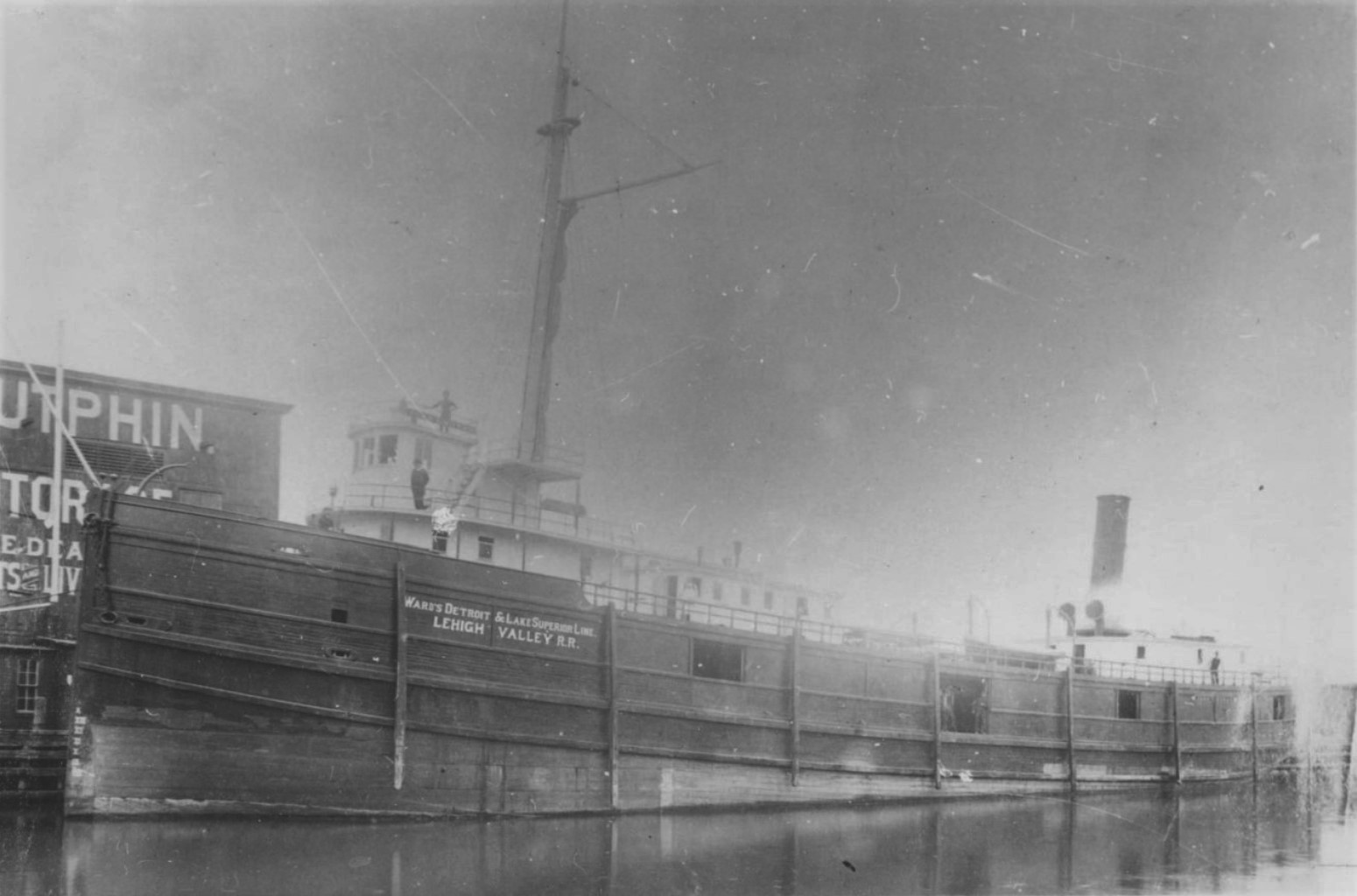
John V. Moran in service for Ward's Detroit & Lake Superior Line

Launched on August 16, 1888, she was hull number 44. She was built for Ward's Crescent Transportation Company, and was operated as part of Ward's Detroit & Lake Superior Line, both of Detroit. Detroit was her first home port, where she was enrolled at on the same day she was launched. She entered service later in August. She was retrofitted with double hoists for loading cargo in 1891. John V. Moran was transferred to the Crescent Transportation Company. During the 1893 shipping season, John V. Moran ran between Buffalo, New York, and Duluth, Minnesota. She was sold to the Union Transit Company of Buffalo.

On May 7, 1896, John V. Moran ran aground near Sailors' Encampment in the St. Marys River at about 5:00 p.m. Her navigation lights were on, and her crew were endeavouring to free her. John V. Moran signaled to a tug for assistance, but the signals were mistaken by the downbound bulk freighter Maurice B. Grover for a "hurry-up signal". Maurice B. Grover initially tried to pass by John V. Moran's stern, unsuccessfully, and instead tried to head past her bow. However, instead of safely passing John V. Moran, Maurice B. Grover rammed John V. Moran amidships at 7:00 p.m. John V. Moran's owners libeled Maurice B. Grover. The case was tried at the Utica, New York by the United States District Court for the Northern District of New York. Judge Alfred Conkling Coxe Sr. exonerated Maurice B. Grover, claiming that John V. Moran was at fault, as she did not give any danger signals prior to the collision. John V. Moran was repaired in Superior, Wisconsin, in June of that year.

In November 1898, John V. Moran was sold to the Crosby Transportation Company of Milwaukee, and ran between the Wisconsin ports of Manitowoc, Sheboygan, and the Michigan ports of Muskegon, and Grand Haven.

=== Final voyage ===
John V. Moran left Milwaukee for Muskegon, on February 9, 1899, at 1:00 p.m., loaded with barrels of flour and miscellaneous cargo. At around midnight, while travelling through an ice field, a piece of ice punctured her hull, causing a serious leak. Captain John McLeod ordered that a significant amount of her cargo to be jettisoned in an attempt to keep John V. Moran afloat. John V. Moran's crew used her whistle to alert the nearby steamer Naomi. Three of John V. Moran's crew began walking towards Naomi. Naomi's crew noticed the lights of the three crewmen and picked them up. Afterwards, she headed over to John V. Moran, picking up the remainder of her crew. On the morning of February 10, Naomi took John V. Moran in tow, as she was still afloat. Although Naomi managed to tow John V. Moran a few miles nearer to Muskegon, she was eventually abandoned as the crew realised that she would not be able to survive the whole journey. John V. Moran's crew walked back over the ice to her, in order to retrieve their belongings. On the morning of February 12, the car ferry Muskegon which was headed for Muskegon, passed John V. Moran, still afloat.

Ten years after John V. Moran sank, her sister ship, Eber Ward was also sunk by ice on Lake Michigan.

== Wreck ==
=== Discovery ===
Drawing of John V. Moran's wreck

The Michigan Shipwreck Research Association of Holland, Michigan, began searching for John V. Moran at the beginning of June 2015. Despite the patchy newspaper reports from 1899, they were able to narrow down the search area to a 10 square mile (25.9 km^{2}) grid system. At 3:30 A.M. on June 5, the side-scan sonar picked up a shipwreck. Initially the shipwreck hunters were unsure whether or not the wreck was John V. Moran. Due to the extreme depth of the wreck, sending a diver down to investigate the wreck would have been extremely difficult. On July 8, the team invited Michigan State Police Underwater Recovery Unit to investigate the wreck. They sent down a remotely operated vehicle to capture footage in order to identify the wreck. Upon reaching the wreck, the team were able to quickly identify it as John V. Moran when they compared the fully intact wreck seen on the footage captured by the remotely operated vehicle to a historic image of John V. Moran.

=== John V. Moran today ===
The wreck of John V. Moran rests upright and remarkably intact in 365 feet (111.3 m) of water. Her pilothouse is intact, her mast, with rigging, is still in place and there is still glass in her windows. Her anchors and all of her railings remain in place. The only piece of her wreck that appears to be missing is her funnel. The remotely operated vehicle also located a hole in the starboard side of John V. Moran's hull, and some minor damage at her port bow. Her discoverers called her "the most intact steamship wreck on the bottom of Lake Michigan, if not all of the Great Lakes".

== Sources ==
- Ashcroft, Brent (2015). "Historic shipwreck identified in Lake Michigan". Detroit, Michigan: Detroit Free Press.
- Alpena County George N. Fletcher Public Library (1) (2020). "Moran, John V. (1888, Package Freighter)". Alpena, Michigan: Alpena County George N. Fletcher Public Library.
- Alpena County George N. Fletcher Public Library (2) (2020). "Ward, Eber (1888, Package Freighter)". Alpena, Michigan: Alpena County George N. Fletcher Public Library.
- Alpena County George N. Fletcher Public Library (3) (2020). "Stevens, William H. (1886, Package Freighter)". Alpena, Michigan: Alpena County George N. Fletcher Public Library.
- Berry (1), Sterling (2021). "Moran, John V." Detroit, Michigan: Great Lakes Vessel Histories of Sterling Berry.
- Berry (2), Sterling (2021). "Ward, Eber". Detroit, Michigan: Great Lakes Vessel Histories of Sterling Berry.
- Berry (3), Sterling (2021). "Stevens, William H." Detroit, Michigan: Great Lakes Vessel Histories of Sterling Berry.
- Bowling Green State University (1) (2010). "John V. Moran". Bowling Green, Ohio: Bowling Green State University.
- Bowling Green State University (2) (2010). "Eber Ward". Bowling Green, Ohio: Bowling Green State University.
- Ellison, Garret (2015). "Deep in Lake Michigan, divers find pristine shipwreck lost in 1899". Grand Rapids, Michigan: Mlive.
- Maritime History of the Great Lakes (1892). "John V. Moran (Propeller), 11 Feb 1892". Canada: Maritime History of the Great Lakes.
- Maritime History of the Great Lakes (1896). "John V. Moran (Propeller), U76748, collision, 1 Jul 1896". Canada: Maritime History of the Great Lakes.
- Maritime History of the Great Lakes (1899). "John V. Moran (Propeller), U76748, sunk by ice, 11 Feb 1899". Canada: Maritime History of the Great Lakes.
- Michigan Shipwreck Research Association (2015). "John V. Moran". Holland, Michigan: Michigan Shipwreck Research Association.
- Reynolds, Philip (2015). "One of deepest Lake Michigan wrecks found". London, United Kingdom: Boat International Media.
- Swayze, David D. (2001). "Great Lakes Shipwrecks – M". Port Huron, Michigan: Boatnerd.
