= SS Hennepin =

Bulk carrier wrecked in Lake Michigan

- Hennepin Shipwreck
- U.S. National Register of Historic Places
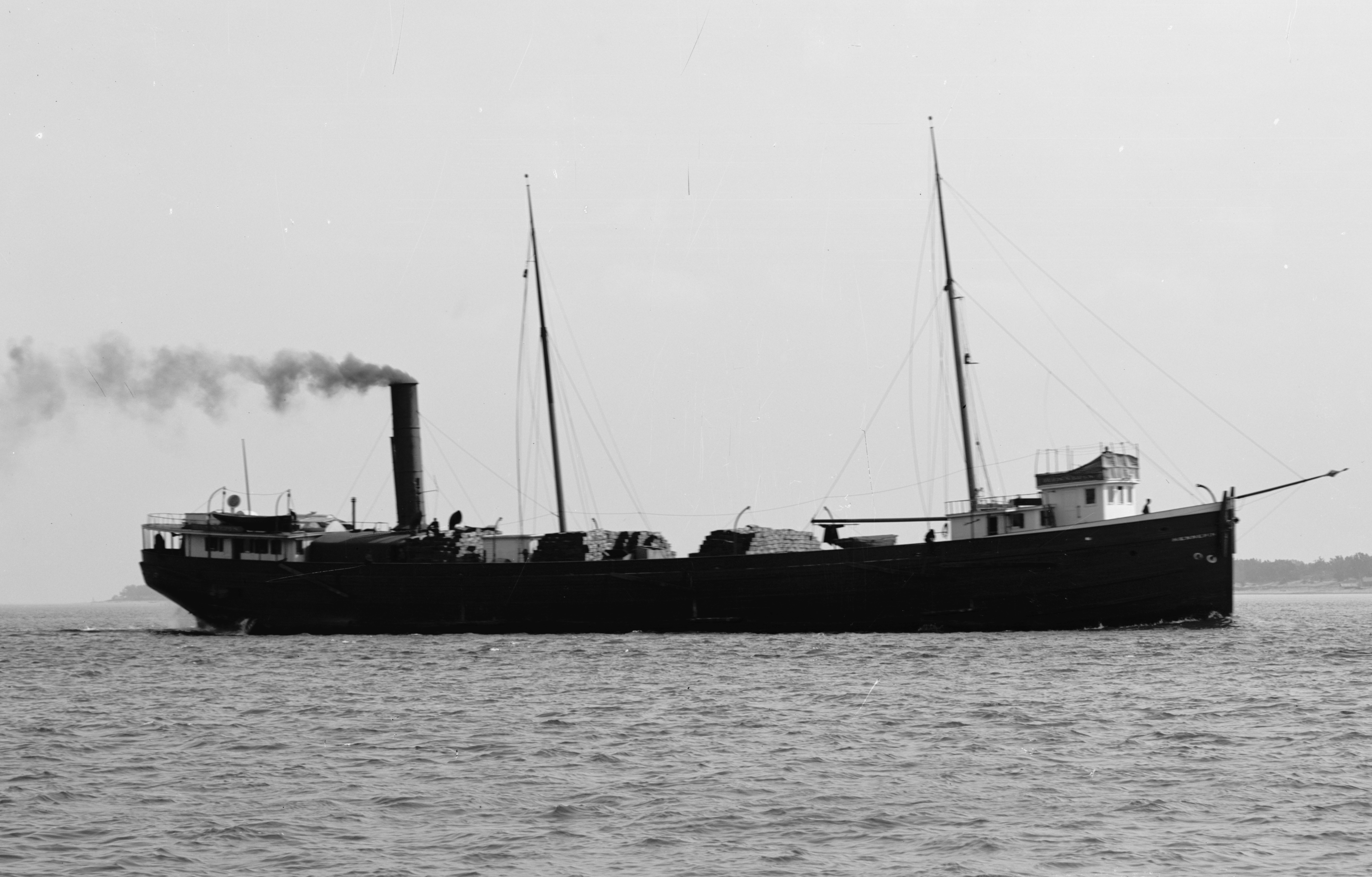
- Hennepin, c. 1901

- Location within Michigan Location within the United States
- Nearest city: South Haven, Michigan, USA
- Coordinates: 42°27′39″N 86°41′47″W
- Built: October 1888
- Architect: Wolf and Davidson
- NRHP reference No.: 07001489
- Added to NRHP: February 1, 2008

Hennepin is a shipwreck off the east coast of Lake Michigan, west of South Haven, Michigan. The ship was originally built in October 1888 and sank on August 18, 1927. Michigan Shipwreck Research Associates found the ship in 2006 and conducted several dives to assess the wreck's condition. The wreck was listed on the National Register of Historic Places on February 1, 2008. She is significant as the first self-unloading bulk carrier.

== Career ==
The ship was built as George H. Dyer by the firm of Wolf and Davidson in Milwaukee, Wisconsin. She was equipped with a steam engine at the time. The ship changed owners a few times, and in 1898, she was later Hennepin, after Louis Hennepin, an explorer of the Great Lakes.

The ship caught fire on June 27, 1901, in Buffalo, New York. The fire damaged most of the upper deck and most of the machinery. The ship was sold to the Lake Shore Stone Company, who fitted her with a conveyor belt and made her a self-unloading ship. This was the world's first self-unloading ship, providing the paradigm for the many self-unloading vessels. The ship had a 1600-ton capacity. She was put to work loading stone from a quarry in Stone Haven, Wisconsin.

Later, in 1923, she was purchased by Construction Materials Corporation and put to use hauling construction aggregate from a quarry on the Grand River to Chicago. The hull was wearing out and becoming unstable, so the ship was converted to a barge by removing her engine. She was hauled by the tugboats Ufasco in 1926 and Lotus in 1927.

== Loss ==
On August 18, 1927, around 10:30 AM, Hennepin ran into a squall on Lake Michigan. The vessel had sprung a leak, and although the crew worked to save the ship, the pumps could not keep up with the volume of water coming in. The crew worked until 2:30 PM that afternoon, but they were unsuccessful, and the crew abandoned the ship for the safety of the tugboat Lotus. Hennepin finally sank around 6:00 PM. Upon the return to port, Captain Ole Hansen said, "She died a hard death."

== Discovery ==
Michigan Shipwreck Research Associates members were searching for the wreck of Northwest Orient Airlines Flight 2501 in 2006. While mapping out sections of the lake, they discovered debris on the bottom that appeared to be a wreck. At first, they identified a small structure nicknamed a "rib cage", but more searching revealed a ship. They sent a team of technical divers to explore the wreck, which was in about 200 feet (61 m) of water. The team examined a capstan and discovered the name "G.H. Dyer" stamped onto the cover, which confirmed it as Hennepin. The pilothouse had been blown off when it sank, but the wheel was still in place and intact. The ship had hit stern-first as identified by the wreckage. The conveyor belts and the A-frame crane structure were still in place and further identified the ship as Hennepin.
