= Underwater Archaeological Society of Chicago =

United States non-profit organization

The Underwater Archaeological Society of Chicago (UASC) is a private non-profit organization in the United States.

== History ==
Before the UASC was founded, members of the Chicago Maritime Society partnered with the Illinois Historic Preservation agency to study the remains of the schooner David Dows in 1987. They undertook the project to document the wreck and inform the public of its historic significance as the only five-masted schooner made for the Great Lakes. The state of Illinois awarded the society a $3,000 grant for the project. The project resulted in the development of a report by professor John M. Mcmanamon, the group's historian. In 1988, Chicago commercial salvage company A & T Recovery located the remains of the three-masted schooner Wells Burt, lost in a storm in 1883 off the northern shores of Chicago. A & T offered the site to the Chicago Maritime Society to conduct a survey. The project generated a great deal of interest from Illinois divers, prompting three of the Chicago Maritime Society members, David Truitt, Valerie (Olson) van Heest, and Kurt Anderson to found the Underwater Archaeological Society of Chicago in 1989 as an offshoot group of the Chicago Maritime Society. The UASC focus would be to document and help preserve the Wells Burt and other Chicago area shipwrecks. The founders remain trustees of the organization today.

In 1989, the UASC mapped, photographed, and videotaped the wreck of the 200-foot-long Wells Burt and attached permanent plastic tags to 325 artifacts as a hopeful deterrent to artifact removal. After their project, the group released the location to the sport diving community, and later that summer, ten artifacts were vandalized and removed from the wreck. The State of Illinois soon authorized the team to recover any remaining loose artifacts and chain the remaining artifacts to the wreck. No further vandalism has been since reported.

The Wells Burt vandalism was featured on the television program Missing Reward, hosted by Stacy Keech. UASC president at the time, Valerie Olson (van Heest), appeared on that program.

In 1989 Chicago area salvor Harry Zych announced his discovery of the wreck of the passenger side wheel steamer PS Lady Elgin that sank in 1860. The Illinois Historic Preservation Agency IHPA brought legal suit against the salvor for removing several artifacts from the wreck. The IHPA requested that the UASC conduct preliminary documentation of the wreck sites that were spread out for more than a mile off the shores of Winnetka, Illinois, to understand what was left on the lake bottom. Project leaders, Valerie Olson (van Heest) and Keith Pearson co-wrote reports with others on the Wells Burt and Lady Elgin, as well as the wreck of the Goshawk, another shipwreck documented by the UASC. Following these initial projects, the UASC conducted numerous other projects to document shipwrecks off Chicago, among them the Silver Spray of Chicago's southern shore.

== See also ==
- Michigan Shipwreck Research Associates
