= SS Michigan =

Great Lakes passenger steamship

Coordinates: 42°48.005′N 086°30.986′W

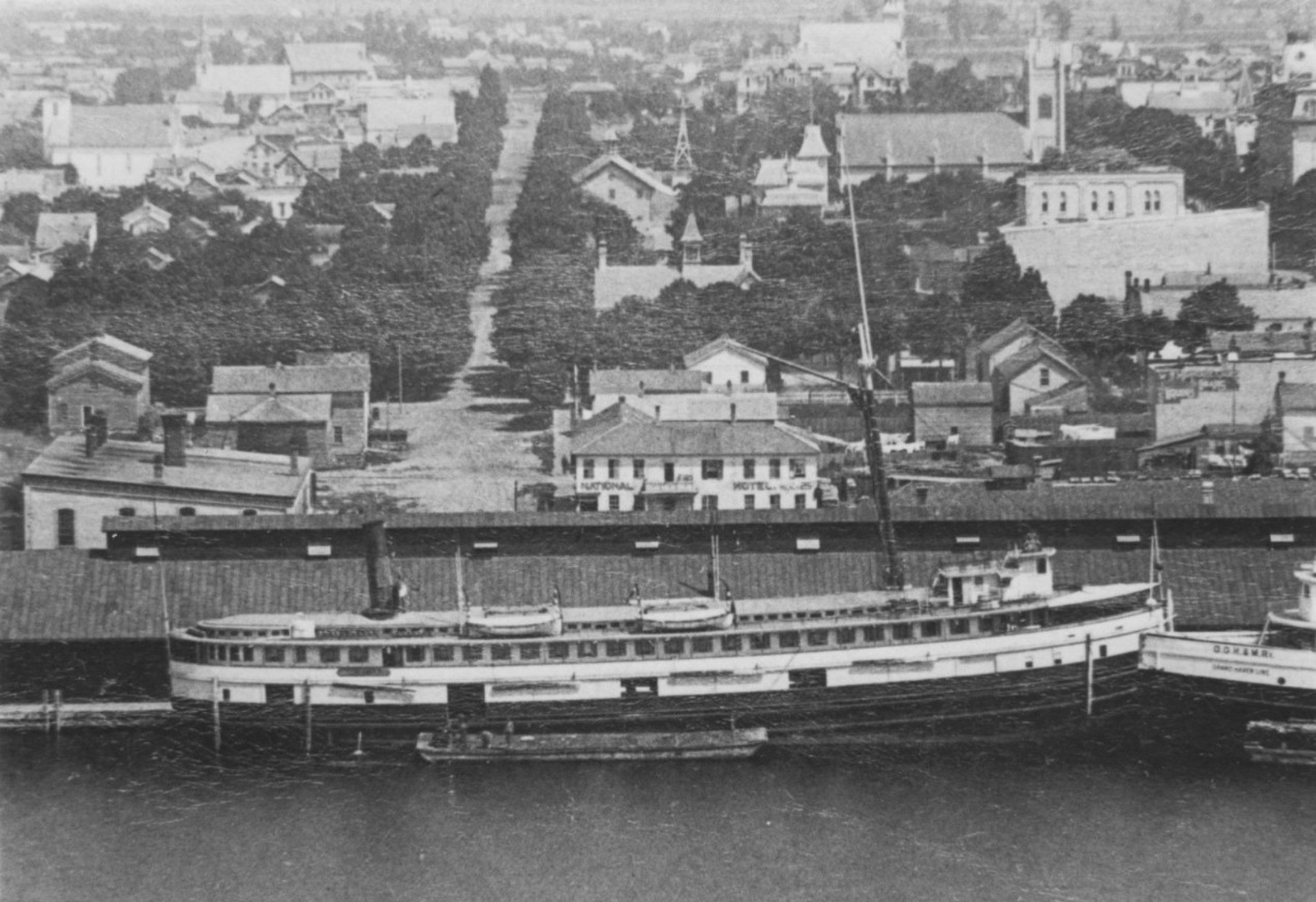
- The Michigan prior to her sinking

History
- Name: SS Michigan
- Owner: Detroit Dry Dock Company
- Builder: Detroit Dry Dock Company of Wyandotte, Michigan, United States
- Laid down: 1881
- Launched: August 20, 1881
- Out of service: March 19, 1885
- Fate: Foundered while trapped in pack ice, Lake Michigan, March 19, 1885

General characteristics
- Class & type: Steamship
- Tonnage: 1,024
- Length: 203.9 ft (62.1 m)
- Beam: 35.1 ft (10.7 m)
- Draft: 11.7
- Installed power: Steam
- Propulsion: Two propellers
- Crew: 30

The SS Michigan was a passenger steamship which transported passengers across the Great Lakes. At the time of her construction, she was one of the most advanced steamships on the Great Lakes. She offered luxurious accommodations for customers that included heated cabins, ornate wood design, and oil paintings to decorate the rooms. She was then purchased by Milwaukee Railway Company. In February 1885, the Michigan became entrapped in an ice pack, and a few weeks later, sank in Lake Michigan.

== Vessel ==
Built by the Detroit Dry Dock Company, in Wyandotte, Michigan, the vessel was constructed with an iron double hull, with three feet (0.91 m) separating the two hulls. In addition to the double hull, another safety feature added were five watertight compartments. 123 cabins were built and were said to be the grandest on the lakes, decorated with velvet carpets, furniture and oil paintings. Her powerhouse was an F & AC compound engine with 27-inch (69 cm) and 44-inch (110 cm) cylinders and a 40-inch (100 cm) stroke. Along with the engine was an 8-foot-diameter (2.4 m), 18-foot-long (5.5 m) boiler built by De Soto & Hutton of Detroit. She displaced 1,024 tons, with a length of 204 feet (62 m) and a width of 35 feet (11 m) feet. The Michigan had a sister ship, the SS Wisconsin.

== Rescue attempt ==
In the early months of 1885, a harsh winter had embattled shipping in Lake Michigan. It was typical for Great Lakes shipping trade to halt during the winter months, but an early thaw in February prompted it to resume. As soon as ships left port with cargo, however, a strong winter storm engulfed the region, dropping three feet (0.91 m) of snow in two days. This caused many ships to become trapped in ice, including two ships owned by the Milwaukee Railway Company, and one of which being the Michigan's sister ship, the Wisconsin. Knowing the ships and their cargo could be doomed if left to the ice pack, the Milwaukee Railway Company decided to use the Michigan and her double hull to break through the ice and free the trapped vessels.

On the morning of February 9, 1885, the Michigan and 29 crewmen set up to see if they could free the ships. That same day, a nor'easter gale blew the ship off course and into an ever-growing ice pack. By the morning of the February 11, she was trapped in ice, drifting south. By February 17, conditions remained unchanged, and the crew was quickly exhausting resources. The captain ordered that the sailors ration supplies, and also enlisted a 17-man team to venture across the frozen lake, to land, as the condition of the ship had worsened. The group, using ice picks, axes, and ropes, covered 12 miles (19 km) and reached shore in Allegan County, Michigan. On February 21, a resupply ship arrived to restock the trapped Michigan.

== Loss ==
February turned to March, and although conditions improved, and ice began to break up, the Michigan was still trapped. On March 19, the pressure on the hull was causing the ship to moan, as the double iron hull buckled, and continued throughout the night. A tugboat, the Arctic arrived the following day as a last effort to free the Michigan. The Arctic became trapped as well. Late that night, the hull of the Michigan became inundated with water, and the captain ordered to abandon ship. All the crew was able to leave the doomed ship and watched as Michigan slipped under the ice, to the bottom on Lake Michigan. The crew then waited on the stuck Arctic until conditions improved, and the tug was freed. There were no deaths in the sinking. There is in fact one death recorded in the Archives, that of Seaman 2/c Charles George Gunderson. Griffith - Hackthorn (archives.gov) Card No. 1043.

== Discovery of the wreck ==
In 2005 the Michigan Shipwreck Research Associates located the wreck of Michigan in 270 feet (82 m) of water off Holland, Michigan. The discovery was made while MSRA members were scanning the lake bottom with David Trotter of Canton, Michigan, who was also instrumental in the 2001 discovery of the H.C. Akeley off Saugatuck. She lies upright on the lake bottom, with her cabin structure collapsed, because of the violent impact with the lake floor when she sank.
