= Northwest Orient Airlines Flight 2501 =

1950 aircraft disappearance

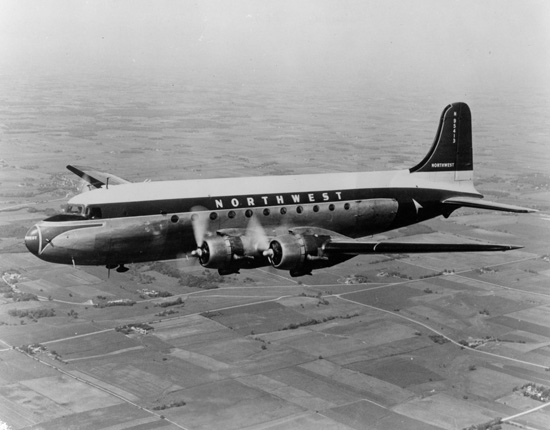
- A DC-4 similar to the accident aircraft

Occurrence
- Date: June 23, 1950
- Summary: Crashed in Lake Michigan; cause unknown
- Site: Lake Michigan; 42°22′N 86°37′W

Aircraft
- Aircraft type: Douglas DC-4 (former C-54)
- Operator: Northwest Orient Airlines
- Registration: N95425 (formerly 42-72165)
- Flight origin: LaGuardia Airport; New York City, New York
- 1st stopover: Minneapolis–St. Paul, Minnesota
- 2nd stopover: Spokane, Washington
- Destination: Seattle, Washington
- Occupants: 58
- Passengers: 55
- Crew: 3
- Fatalities: 58 (all presumed; only body fragments found)
- Survivors: 0

Northwest Orient Airlines Flight 2501 was a DC-4 operating its daily transcontinental service between New York City and Seattle when it crashed in Lake Michigan on the night of June 23, 1950. The flight was carrying 55 passengers and three crew members; the loss of all 58 aboard made it the deadliest commercial airliner accident in America at the time.

According to the Civil Aeronautics Board report, the aircraft was at approximately 3,500 feet (1,100 meters) over Lake Michigan, 18 miles (29 kilometers) north-northwest of Benton Harbor, Michigan, when flight controllers lost radio contact with it soon after the pilot had requested a descent to 2,500 feet (760 meters). Numerous witnesses reported hearing engine sputtering noises and a flash of light around the time of the last radio transmission. A search was commenced by the Navy including using sonar and dragging the bottom of Lake Michigan with trawlers, but to no avail. The Coast Guard, using four large vessels, found and recovered considerable light debris, upholstery, and human body fragments floating on the surface, which was eventually turned over to Northwest. County personnel recovered debris and human remains that washed ashore between Benton Harbor and South Haven, Michigan.

== Cause ==
At the time of the last contact Flight 2501 was entering a squall line and turbulence. Since the plane's wreckage underwater has not been found, the cause of the crash has not been determined. There is output from a hindcast simulation of the possible weather conditions during the event. The incident was reported on June 25, 1950, by The New York Times with dateline of June 24 as follows:

A Northwest Airlines DC-4 airplane with fifty-eight persons aboard, last reported over Lake Michigan early today, was still missing tonight after hundreds of planes and boats had worked to trace the craft or any survivors. All air and surface craft suspended search operations off Milwaukee at nightfall except the Coast Guard cutter Woodbine. The airplane, a four-engine 'air coach' bound from New York to Minneapolis and Seattle, was last heard from at 1:13 o'clock this morning, New York Time, when it reported that it was over Lake Michigan, having crossed the eastern shore line near South Haven, Mich. The craft was due over Milwaukee at 1:27 A.M. and at Minneapolis at 3:23 A.M. If all aboard are lost, the crash will be the most disastrous in the history of American commercial aviation. The plane carried a capacity load of fifty-five passengers and a crew of three, headed by Capt. Robert Lind, 35 years old, of Hopkins, Minn. In Minneapolis, Northwest Airlines said the craft was 'presumed to be down,' and that they were beginning notification of relatives of passengers. In his last report, Captain Lind requested permission to descend from 3,500 to 2,500 feet because of a severe electrical storm which was lashing the lake with high velocity winds. Permission to descend was denied by the Civil Aeronautic Authority because there was much more traffic at the lower altitude.

== Aftermath ==
The missing airliner became the subject of an annual search by Michigan Shipwreck Research Associates (MSRA), a Michigan-based non-profit organization. The search effort began in 2004 as a joint venture between author and explorer Clive Cussler and the MSRA. Cussler ended his involvement in 2013, but sent his side-scan sonar operator, Ralph Wilbanks, back to Michigan in 2015, 2016, and 2017 to follow some leads discovered by MSRA, which turned out to be a field of construction debris and a lost load of scrap metal. MSRA continued the search each year through 2024. In total, the organization covered about 600 square miles (1,600 km^{2}), locating nine never-before-discovered shipwrecks, but not the wreckage of Flight 2501.

In September 2008, MSRA affiliate Chriss Lyon, investigating the crash of Flight 2501, found an unmarked grave that a sexton register indicated contains the remains of some of the 58 victims. Valerie van Heest, MSRA co-director and author of the book Fatal Crossing, says human remains floating offshore and recovered by the Coast Guard were buried in that mass grave in the Riverview Cemetery in St. Joseph without the knowledge of the victims' families, and the grave was never marked. In 2008, Van Heest of MSRA organized a ceremony at the cemetery to unveil a large black granite marker, donated by Filbrandt Family Funeral Home, that lists the names of the 58 and the words "In Memory of Northwest Flight 2501, June 23, 1950. Gone but Never Forgotten." About 10 families of the victims were able to attend the ceremony.

Another mass burial site was discovered in 2015 at Lakeview Cemetery in South Haven by cemetery sexton Mary Ann Frazier and her mother, Beverly Smith, working on a genealogy project. It contains the remains of victims found along the beaches of South Haven. That grave, also, had long been unmarked. Frazier contacted van Heest and together they planned a memorial service before the 65th anniversary. Filbrandt organized the service, which was led by Pastor Robert Linstrom. St. Joe Monument Works donated a marker for the gravesite; it was delivered to the cemetery a few days before the 65th anniversary of the crash. On June 24, 2015, a remembrance service was held at the grave site. Van Heest delivered a speech about the victims, and South Haven Mayor Robert Burr, along with Craig Rich from the MSRA, read off all of the 58 victims' names. After each name was read, a bell was rung.

The crash, van Heest's work to locate and contact the families of the victims, and the MSRA search effort was featured on an episode of the Discovery Channel program Expedition Unknown (season 8, episode 2), which aired on February 12, 2020.

The crash was featured on an episode of the History Channel program The Unbelievable with Dan Aykroyd (season 1, episode 1), which aired on December 1, 2023.

A 20-year search for the wreckage was suspended in June 2025. The searchers surmised that the plane broke into small pieces and sank into the muck.
