= Bubbly Creek =

Branch of the Chicago River in Chicago, US

Bubbly Creek South Fork of the South Branch of the Chicago River
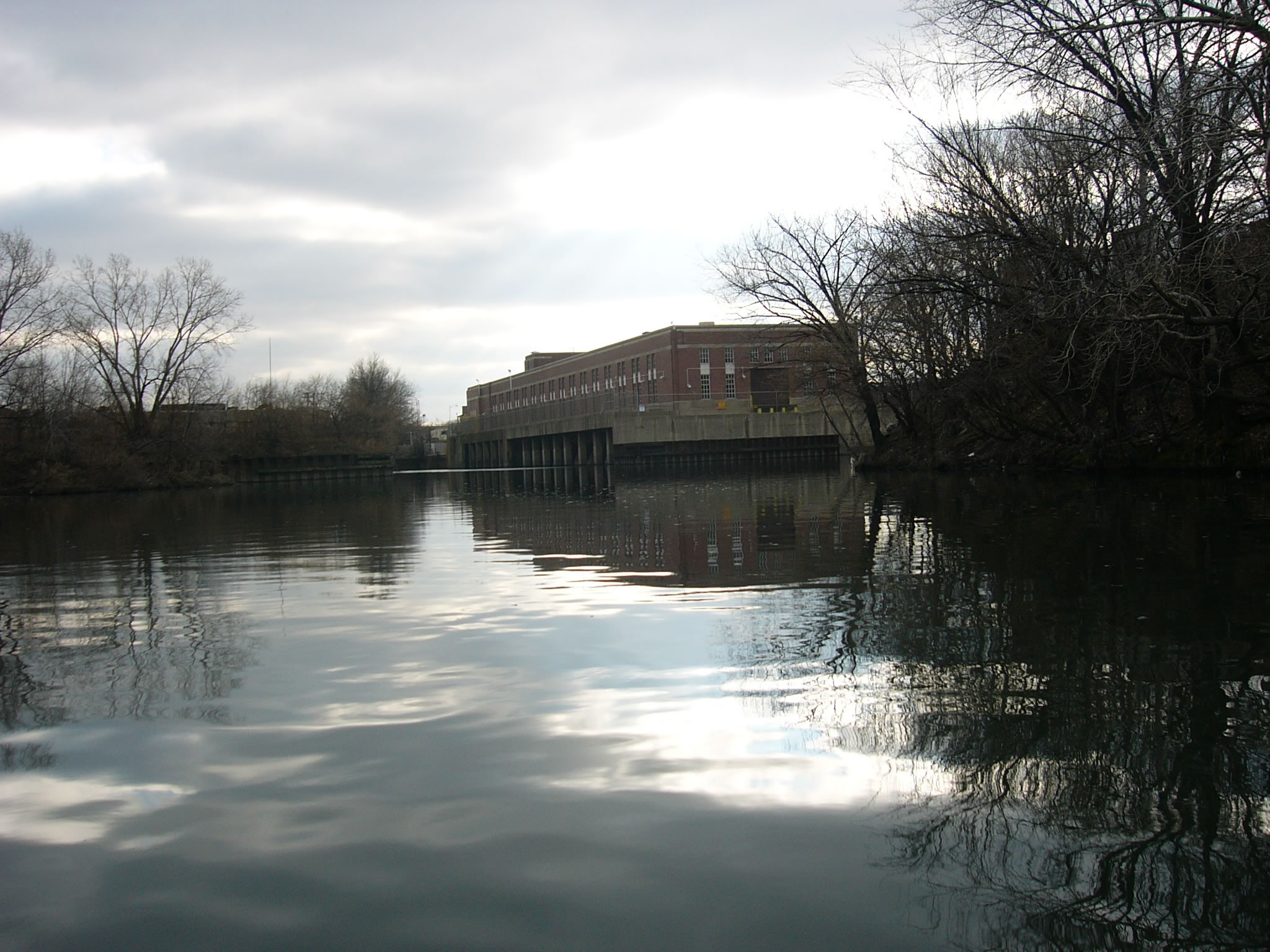
- Headwaters of Bubbly Creek and the Racine Avenue Pump Station

Physical characteristics
- Source
  - location: Near W. Pershing Road, Chicago
  - coordinates: 41°49′24″N 87°38′47″W
  - elevation: 603 ft (184 m)
- Mouth
  - location: Confluence with the South Branch Chicago River in Chicago
  - coordinates: 41°49′33″N 87°39′27″W
  - elevation: 581 ft (177 m)
- Length: 2 mi (3.2 km)

Basin features
- GNIS ID: 1826468

Bubbly Creek is the nickname given to the South Fork of the South Branch of the Chicago River. It runs entirely within the city of Chicago. It marks the boundary between the Bridgeport and McKinley Park community areas of the city. The creek derives its name from the gases bubbling out of the riverbed from the decomposition of blood and entrails dumped into the river in the early 20th century by the local meat-packing businesses surrounding the Union Stock Yards directly south of the creek's endpoint at Pershing Road. It was brought to notoriety by Upton Sinclair in his exposé on the American meat packing industry titled The Jungle.

Bubbly Creek originates near 38th Street, at the Racine Avenue Pump Station of the Metropolitan Water Reclamation District of Greater Chicago. It flows in a generally northward direction for approximately 6,600 feet (2,000 m), and joins with the South Branch of the Chicago River.

== History ==
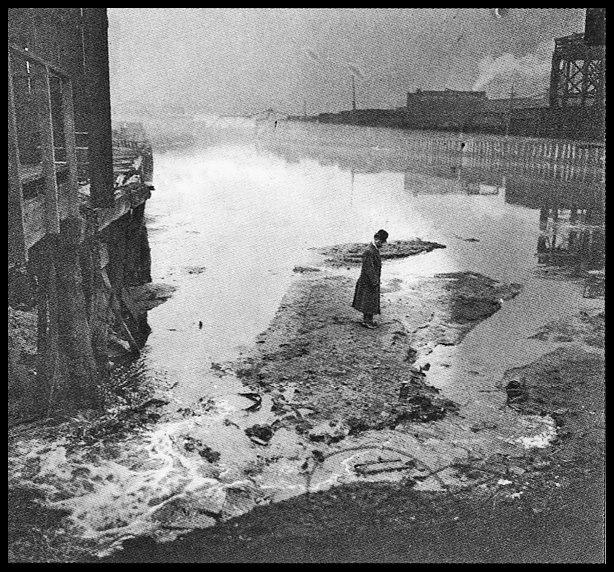
A man standing on slaughterhouse-derived waste in Bubbly Creek in Chicago in 1911.

The area surrounding Bubbly Creek was originally a wetland; during the 19th century, channels were dredged to increase the rate of flow into the Chicago River and dry out the area to increase the amount of habitable land in the fast-growing city. The South Fork became an open sewer for the local stockyards, especially the Union Stock Yards. Meat-packers dumped waste, such as blood and entrails, into the nearest river. The creek received so much blood and offal that it began to bubble methane and hydrogen sulfide gas from the products of decomposition.

In 1906, author Upton Sinclair wrote The Jungle, a portrait of America's meat packing industry. In it, he reports on the state of Bubbly Creek, writing:

"Bubbly Creek" is an arm of the Chicago River, and forms the southern boundary of the Union Stock Yards; all the drainage of the square mile of packing-houses empties into it so that it is really a great open sewer a hundred or two feet wide. One long arm of it is blind, and the filth stays there forever and a day. The grease and chemicals that are poured into it undergo all sorts of strange transformations, which are the cause of its name; it is constantly in motion as if huge fish were feeding in it, or great leviathans disporting themselves in its depths. Bubbles of carbonic gas will rise to the surface and burst, and make rings two or three feet wide. Here and there the grease and filth have caked solid, and the creek looks like a bed of lava; chickens walk about on it, feeding, and many times an unwary stranger has started to stroll across and vanished temporarily. The packers used to leave the creek that way, till every now and then the surface would catch on fire and burn furiously, and the fire department would have to come and put it out. Once, however, an ingenious stranger came and started to gather this filth in scows, to make lard out of; then the packers took the cue, and got out an injunction to stop him, and afterwards gathered it themselves. The banks of "Bubbly Creek" are plastered thick with hairs, and this also the packers gather and clean.

— Upton Sinclair, The Jungle

== Present situation ==
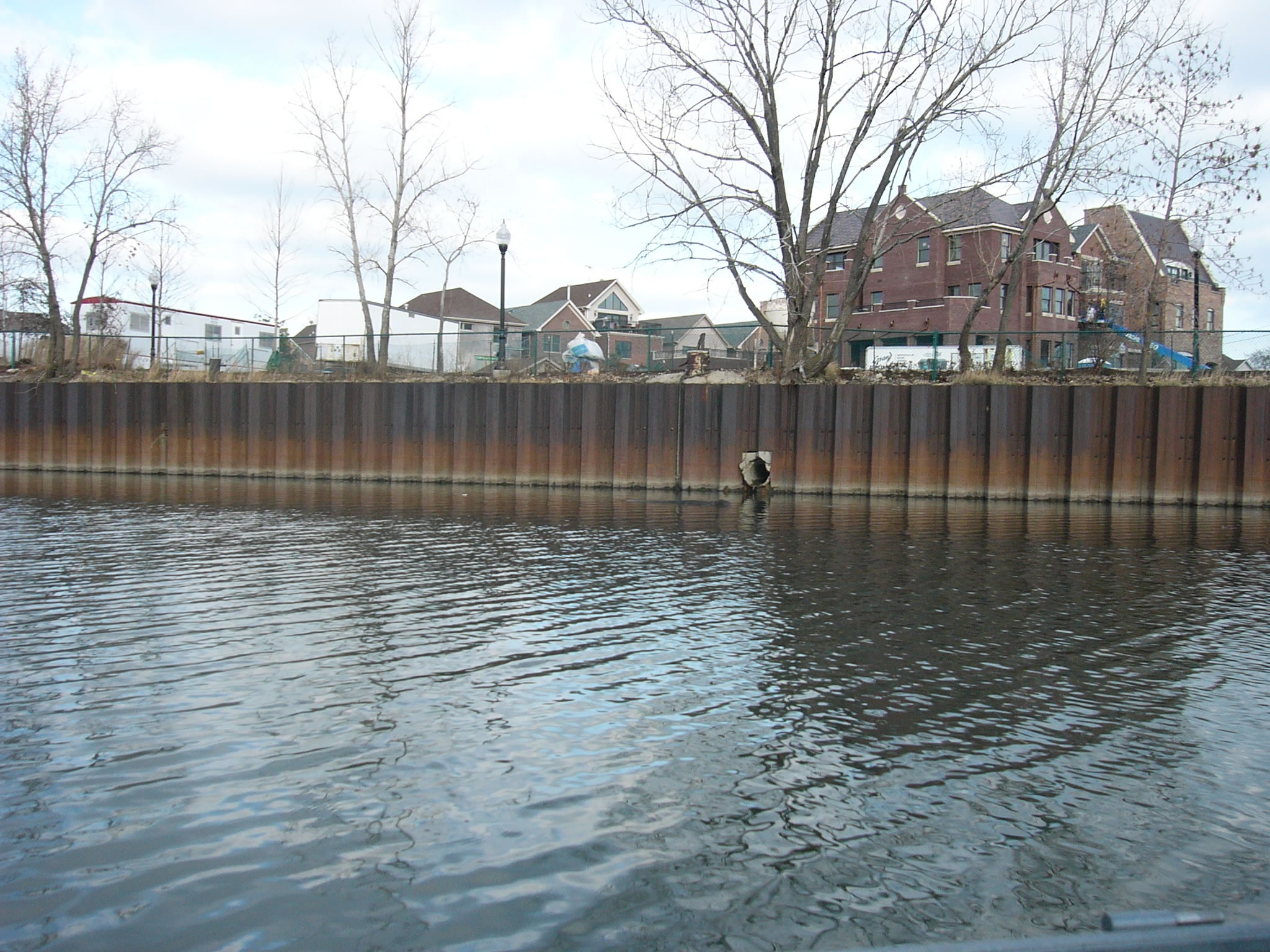
Bubbly Creek and Bridgeport Village

Two heavily polluted streams that joined to create the South Fork were later filled in, but their courses can still be seen today in the configuration of streets and railroad tracks in the area. The area has been increasingly occupied by residential development such as Bridgeport Village; a program to oxygenate the creek by continuously injecting compressed air into the water has met with limited success, although the creek's odor has been much reduced. Some fish and vegetation have returned in recent decades.

Areas near the creek have been designated for recreational uses including parks, and developers and the city agreed on a 60-foot (18 m) setback to allow for remediation. However, during heavy rains, millions of gallons of wastewater continue to be dumped into the stagnant creek by the Metropolitan Water Reclamation District of Greater Chicago.

As of 2007, the city and the Army Corps of Engineers were considering a $2.65 million feasibility study to look at restoration options, which would have implications for the remainder of the Chicago River system due to the unusual challenges of Bubbly Creek. The creek's waters are largely stagnant, having little gradient; the study investigated several possibilities, including a meandering stream amid a wetland, to restore an oxygenated system. The Corps had proposed restoring about 44 acres (18 ha) of water and surrounding land, in part by covering the creek bottom with 6 inches (15 cm) of sand and 6 inches (15 cm) of rocks. The renovation project was expected to cost $15.4 million. In 2015 the project was stalled due to contamination discovered in the creek's sediments.

A private society has opened the Chicago Maritime Museum, a museum and memorialization of Chicago's river and maritime heritage, on 35th Street adjacent to Bubbly Creek. Cleanup of Bubbly Creek by groups like Urban Rivers and Friends of the Chicago River have resulted in increased wildlife sightings, including beavers and a bald eagle.
