= Urban Rivers =

Nonprofit organization that aims at restoring the waterways in Chicago, Illinois

- Formation: 2014
- Type: Non-profit
- Headquarters: 1440 N Kingsbury St. Ste 005 Chicago, IL 60642
- Executive Director: Nick Wesley
- Website: https://www.urbanriv.org
- Formerly called: The Naru Project

Urban Rivers is a nonprofit organization dedicated to environmental remediation of the waterways in Chicago, Illinois. The organization is focused on studying and reviving the city's river ecosystem and water health with floating wetlands. Urban Rivers created the world's first floating eco-park, the Wild Mile.

== History ==
In 2013 Josh Yellin, Zachary Damato and Nick Wesley raised concerns about water pollution and ecological degradation in the Chicago River system. To combat the issues they founded Urban rivers as "The Naru Project" in 2014. The organization's focus was water pollution and ecological degradation at the Chicago River’s South Branch "Bubbly Creek." The creek was used for commercial transportation and through much of its history as a dumping ground for nearby meat packing industries.

== Projects ==
=== Academic Projects ===
Urban Rivers works alongside local and state universities in Illinois. They consult with these institutions on local plants, water chemistry, aquatic macroinvertebrates, and fish. In order to monitor and study changes in stream health related to bug populations Urban Rivers collaborates with Northeastern Illinois University, DePaul University as well as the Chicago Metropolitan Water Reclamation District . To study water chemistry and geology Urban Rivers works with Dr. Eric Peterson from the geology department at Illinois State University. Dr. Petersons work focuses on studying the presence of nutrients, chloride, oxygen, chlorophyll, and heavy metals in the Wild Mile.

Urban Rivers has published works, alongside researchers from Northeastern University in Boston and the National Aquarium in Baltimore Urban Rivers has helped determine the ecological impacts of floating wetlands across three contrasting sites in Chicago, Baltimore, and Boston. Based on their observations in the Wild Mile the researchers published a study on the application of floating wetlands for the improvement of degraded urban water.

=== Bubbly Creek ===
Alongside Shedd Aquarium, Urban Rivers added over three thousand square feet of floating habitat to the South Branch of the Chicago River. They create the habitats by utilizing a 'riverponic' system: they combine together polyethylene and metal frames, matting, dropping them in the water, adding plants, and anchoring the islands to the river bottom.

In February 2025, Urban Rivers captured video of a "remarkably rotund" beaver near Bubbly Creek. This sparked an Internet naming contest, subsequently naming the beaver "Ida Beav Wells."

=== The Wild Mile ===
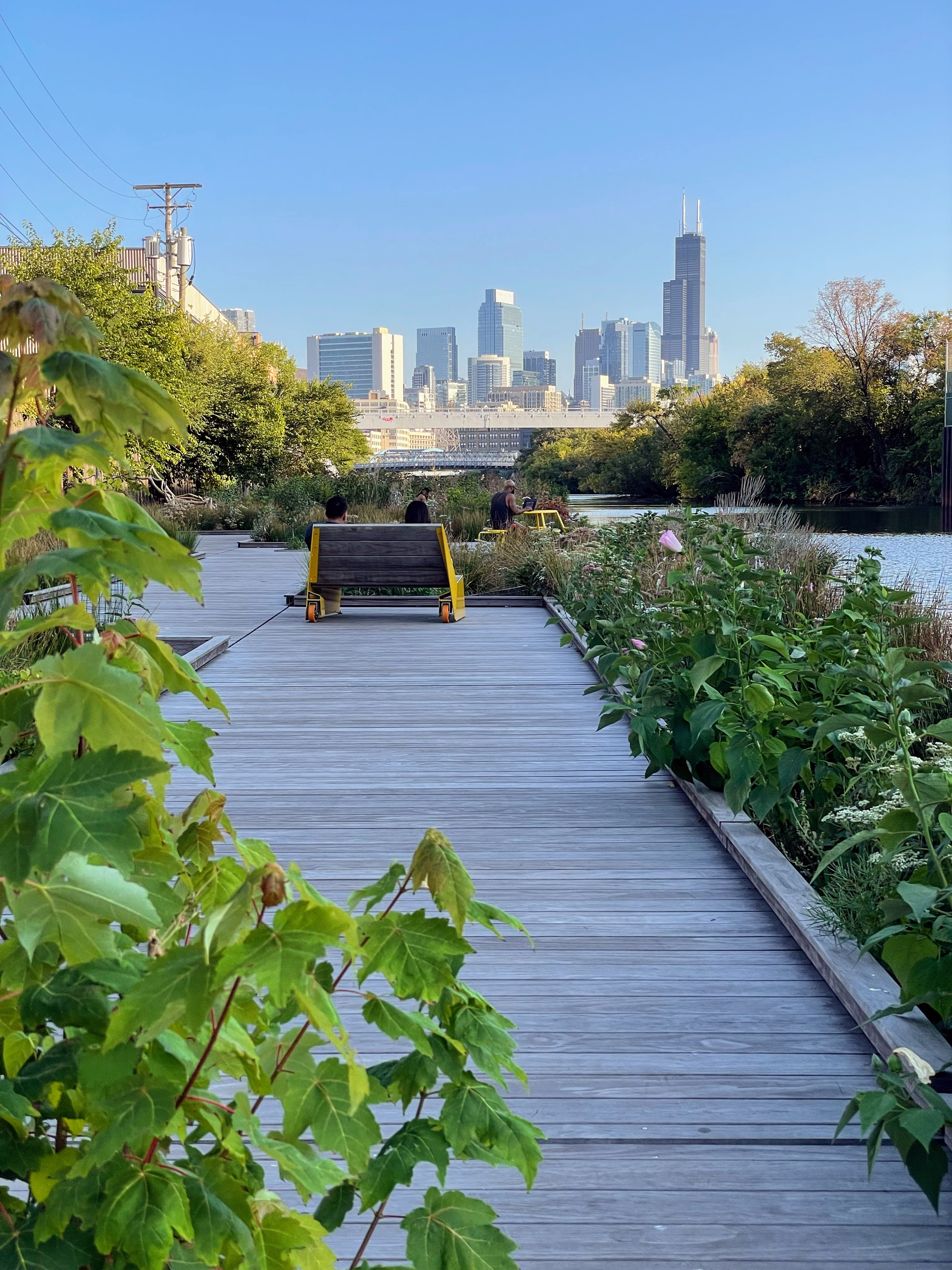
Looking southeast towards the Loop from the Wild Mile.

The Wild Mile is Chicago's first floating eco-park, it is made using Urban Rivers 'riverponic' system to emulate natural river ecologies. Together with Skidmore, Owings & Merrill, Urban Rivers designed the Wild Mile to attract wildlife such as pollinators, birds, fish, and turtles. SOM and Urban Rivers also enlisted the help of Omni Ecosystems, Near North Unity Program, REI, Whole Foods Market, engineers at Tetra Tech, d'Escoto, and the U.S. Army Corps of Engineers on the project. Peter Nagle, Curator of Aquatics at Chicago's Botanic Garden, heads Urban rivers work on plant life in their biomes, informing them on vegetation design. Urban Rivers uses "river rangers" to oversee the well-being of plants and wildlife and address issues like litter, weeds, and invasive species.

The City of Chicago is the primary funder of Urban Rivers 'Wild Mile.' The city's first financial contribution was $1.4 million dollars granted to Urban Rivers through Open Space Impact Fees (OSIF). These fees are paid by new residential development projects in order to develop and improve public open spaces. In addition to this funding, in 2022 Mountain Dew named Urban Rivers as a recipient of their 2022 Outdoor Grant. Using these funds Urban Rivers plans to double the size of the existing Wild Mile and place a third location by the junction of the Chicago river and the North Shore Channel with funding from National Fish and Wildlife Foundation.

The Metropolitan Water Reclamation District conducts fish surveys alongside the Shedd Aquarium in the Wild Mile looking at larval and juvenile fish to aid Urban rivers, which support plant community growth alongside the fish reproductive cycle.

The Goose Island Overlook has hosted seed starting and guerrilla gardening classes on Urban Rivers learning platform in the Wild Mile.

In May 2023, a picture of a large snapping turtle nearby the Wild Mile went viral and was dubbed Chonkasaurus Rex. Urban Rivers' Phil Nicodemus noted that snapping turtles were a common sight in the area since the river rehabilitation began.

=== Waterway Robotics ===
Utilizing funding from Kickstarter, Urban Rivers developed a prototype autonomous robot to remove trash from the waterways.

=== River Mussel Project ===
As part of their waterway improvement project at Goose Island, Urban rivers has helped reproduce more than fifteen hundred mussels (Pyganodon grandis) by extracting larvae and installing temporary habitats. Mussels remove sediment and consume algae and plankton, thus largely improving river odor. In 2024, Urban rivers was granted a permit by the Illinois Department of Natural Resources to capture five pregnant river mollusks in order to promote their reproductive cycle.

=== Summer Programs ===
Urban Rivers hosts summer programs; in 2023, they hosted the Environmental Justice Freedom School (EJFS). EJFS is an opportunity for students to receive climate and environment education.

== See also ==
- Rewilding
