= PS Lady Elgin =

American sidewheel steamship

Coordinates: 42°11′00″N 87°39′00″W

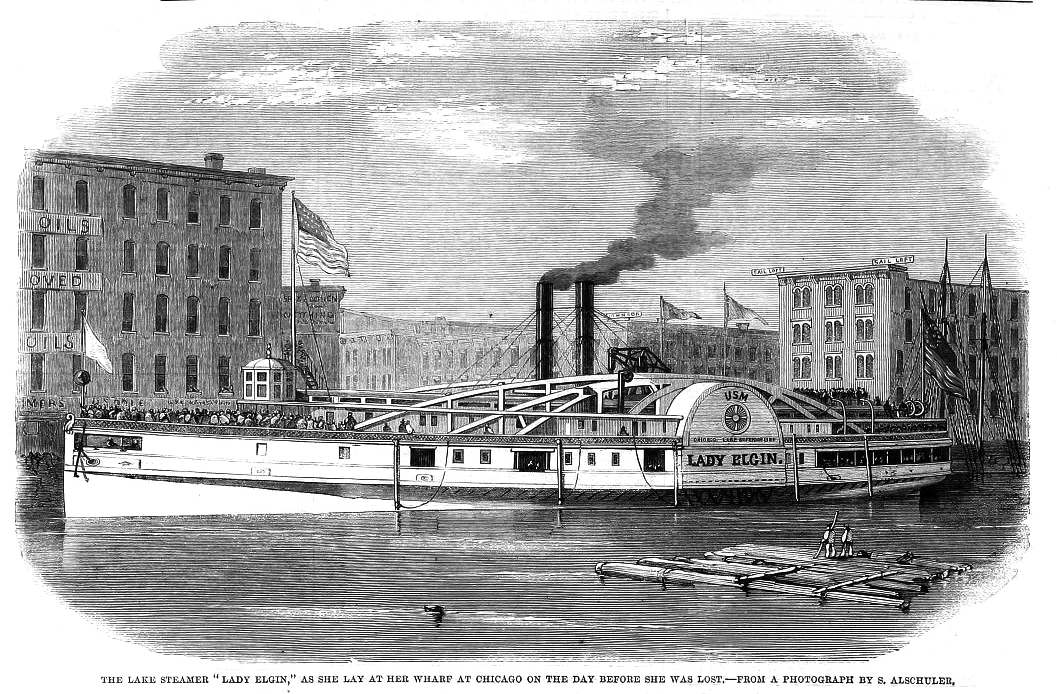
- Lady Elgin at dock, September 7, 1860

History

United States
- Name: Lady Elgin
- Operator: Gurdon Saltonstall Hubbard
- Builder: Bidwell and Banta; Buffalo, New York
- Completed: 1851
- Fate: Sunk in collision with schooner Augusta of Oswego September 8, 1860
- Notes: First enrollment issued at Buffalo, New York November 5, 1851

General characteristics
- Class & type: Sidewheel steamer - passengers and package freight
- Tonnage: 1037.70 gross
- Length: 252 ft (77 m)
- Beam: 32.66 ft (9.95 m)
- Height: 13 ft (4.0 m)
- Notes: Wood hull vessel

PS Lady Elgin was a wooden-hulled sidewheel steamship that sank in Lake Michigan off the fledgling town of Port Clinton, Illinois, whose geography is now divided between Highland Park and Highwood, Illinois, after she was rammed in a gale by the schooner Augusta in the early hours of September 8, 1860. The passenger manifest was lost with the collision, but the sinking of Lady Elgin resulted in the loss of about 300 lives in what was called "one of the greatest marine horrors on record". Four years after the disaster, a new rule required sailing vessels to carry running lights. The Lady Elgin disaster remains the greatest loss of life on open water in the history of the Great Lakes.

In 1994, a process began to list the shipwreck on the National Register of Historic Places. After it was determined to be eligible for listing in 1999, the process ended after an objection by the owner, so the shipwreck is not listed on the Register.

== Career ==
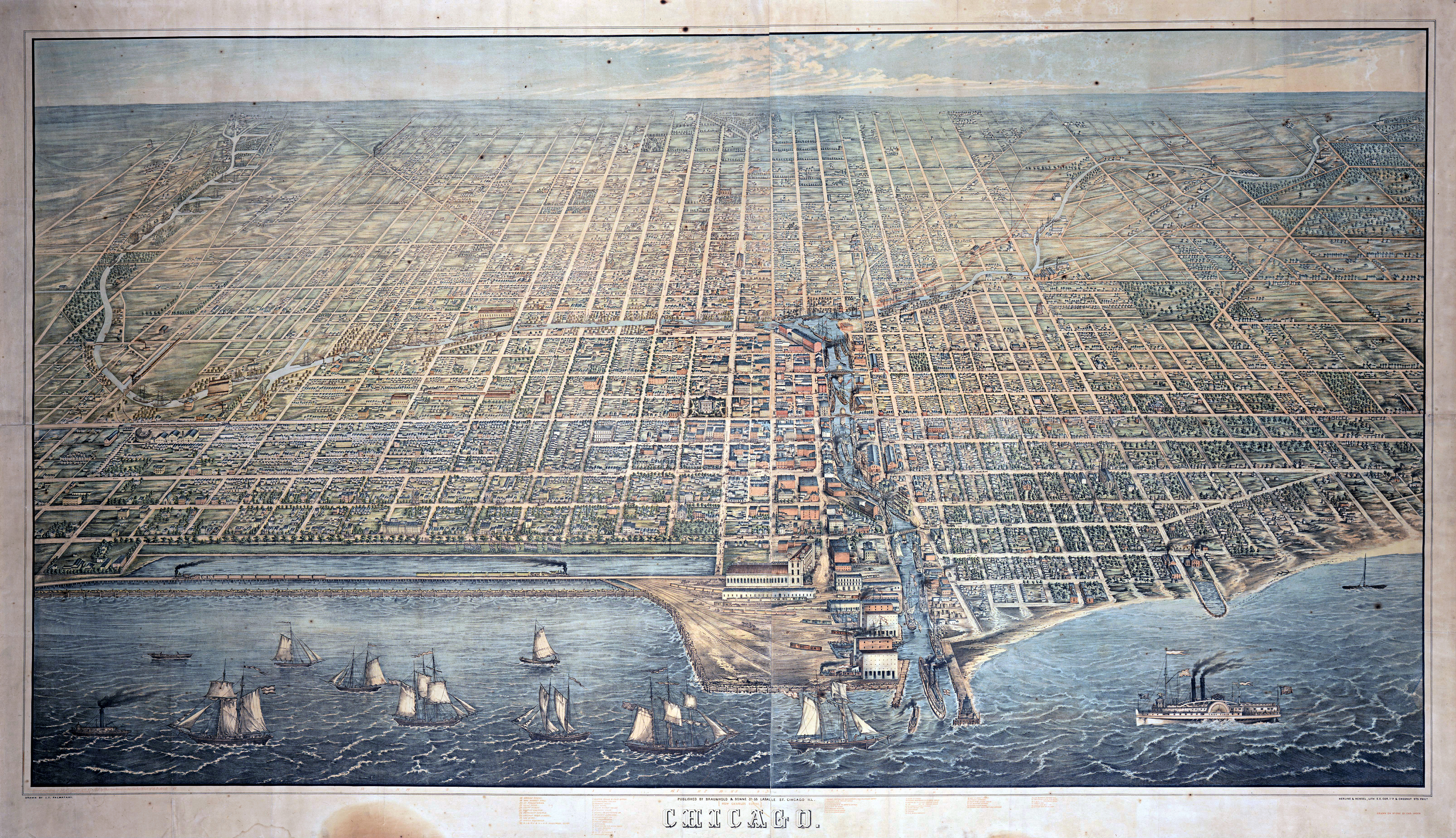
1857 bird's-eye view of Chicago, with Lady Elgin at bottom right

Lady Elgin was built in 1851 in Buffalo, New York, at a cost of $95,000. (Note: equivalent to $3,676,500 in 2025) She was named after the wife of Lord Elgin, Canada's Governor General from 1847 to 1854. During her time, the wooden-hulled sidewheeler was one of the most elegantly appointed passenger ships plying the Great Lakes. Rated a first-class steamer, she was a favorite with the traveling public. Early in her career she ran between Buffalo and Chicago, then later between Chicago and Collingwood, Ontario. For many of her later seasons, she plied the route between Chicago and other Lake Michigan ports and Lake Superior.

During Lady Elgin's career she was involved in numerous accidents. She sank and was repaired in 1854 after striking a rock at Manitowoc, Wisconsin. In 1855, she was towed to Chicago after an accident to her machinery. In 1857, she was damaged by fire. In June 1858, she struck a reef at Copper Harbor, Michigan. In August 1858, she was stranded on Au Sable Point Reef in Lake Superior. In October 1859, she was towed to Marquette, Michigan after breaking her crossbeam. In November 1859, she was towed again when her crank pin broke near Point Iroquois, Michigan. Her final blow came in 1860 when she was rammed by the wooden schooner Augusta ten miles from shore. In 1899, Great Lakes historian J.B. Mansfield called Lady Elgin's sinking "one of the greatest marine horrors on record".

== Final voyage ==
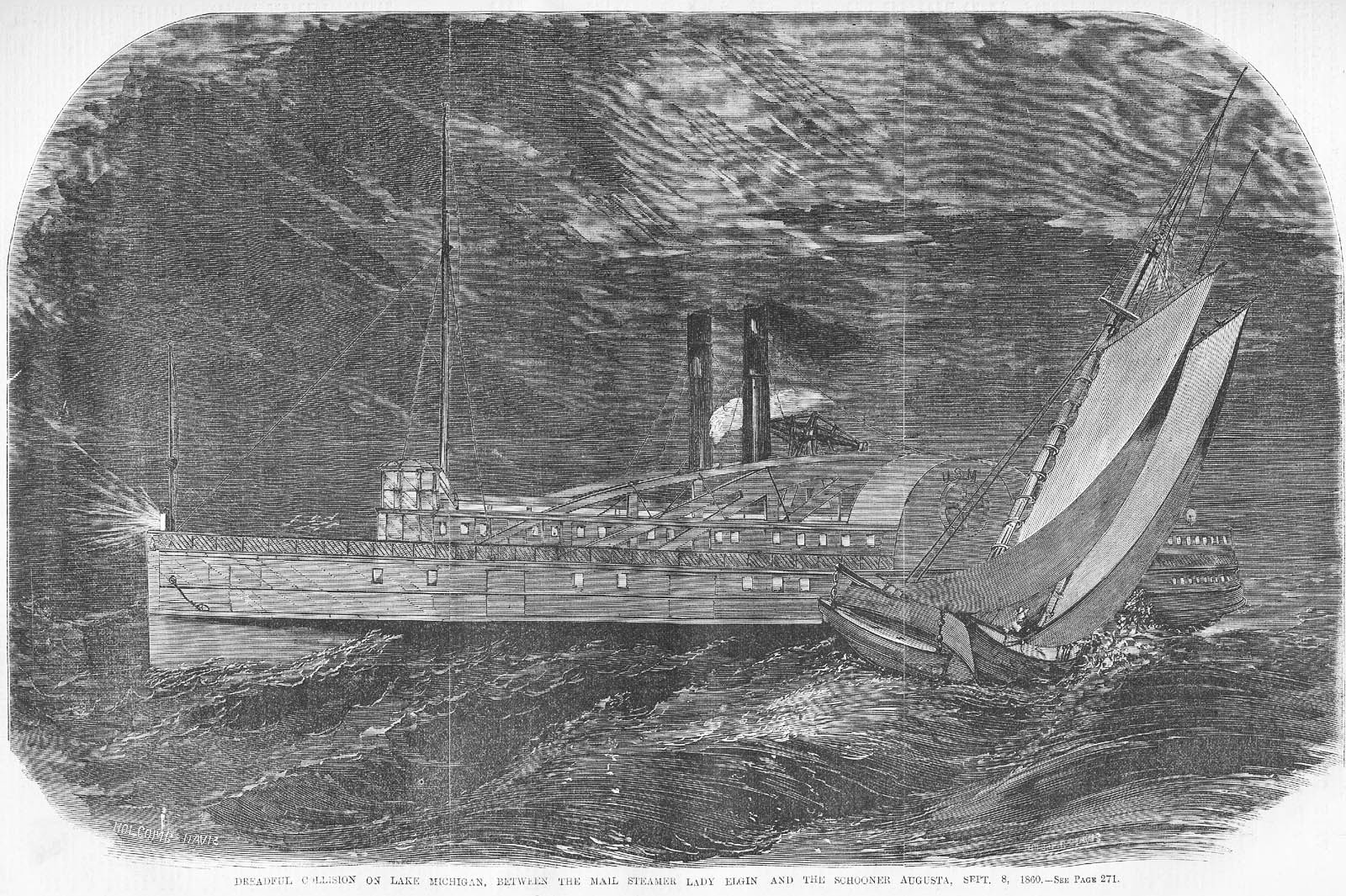
Wood-engraving of the collision from Frank Leslie's Illustrated Newspaper

On the morning of September 6, 1860 Lady Elgin left Milwaukee, Wisconsin, from the Dooley, Martin, Dousman, and Company Dock, for Chicago, carrying members of Milwaukee's Union Guard to hear a campaign speech by Stephen A. Douglas, Abraham Lincoln's opponent, although there is no clear historical evidence that Douglas actually appeared. The passengers spent the day of September 7 listening to political speeches followed by an evening of entertainment by a German brass band on board Lady Elgin. On the return trip to Milwaukee that night, the brightly lit Lady of Elgin was steaming through Lake Michigan against gale force winds when she was rammed by the schooner Augusta of Oswego. Augusta was sailing using only a single white light, mounted on a five-foot Samson on the bow, and did not attempt, or was unable, to turn to avoid the collision in the gale. On the morning of the collision (September 8) at 2:30 am, Augusta rammed the port side of Lady Elgin, damaging her own bowsprit and headgear, while holing the latter ship below the waterline.

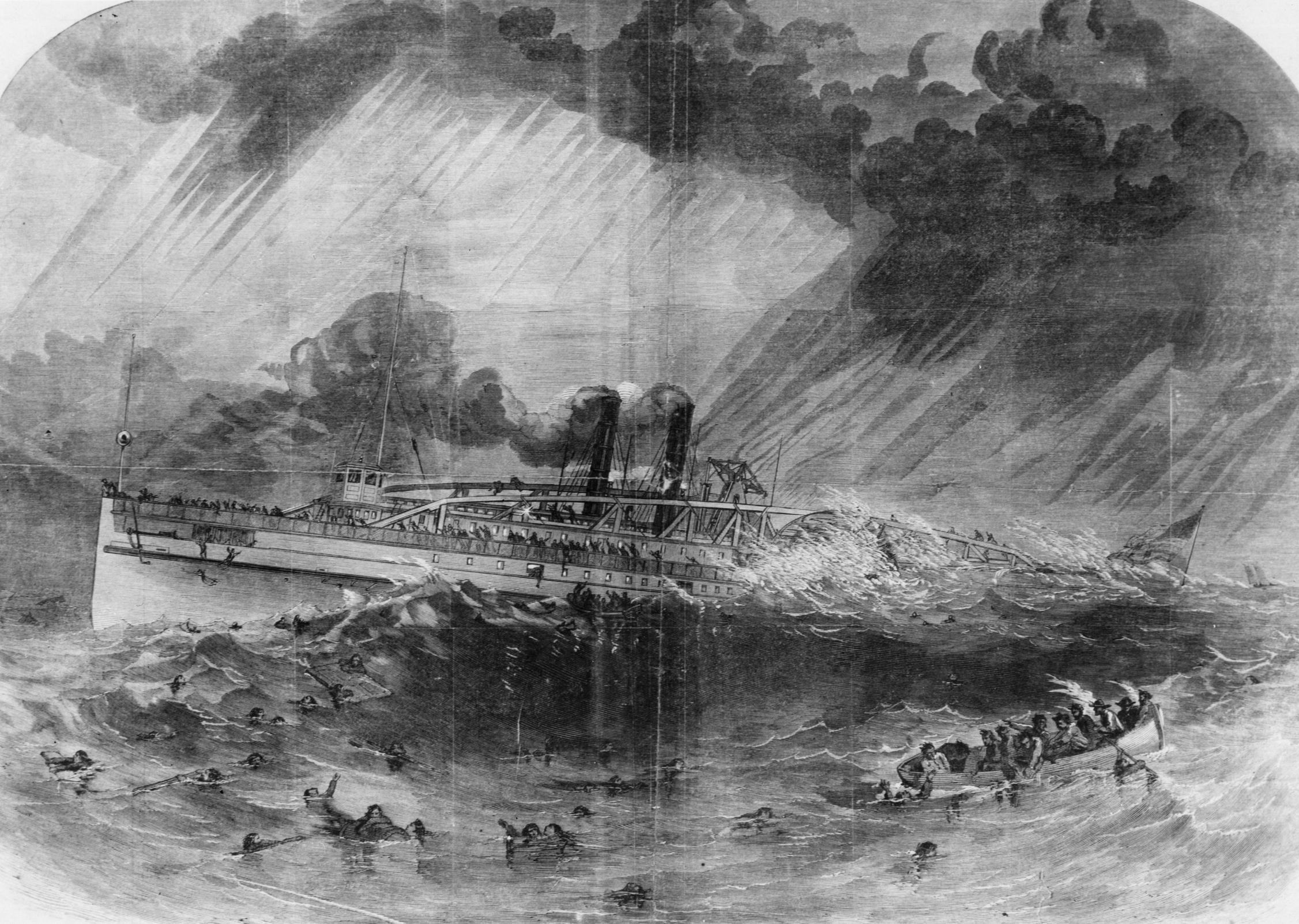
The Lady Elgin, sinking, half an hour after she had been run into, off Winnetka, Illinois - New York Illustrated News

Concerned that she was damaged and believing Lady Elgin had gotten safely away, Augusta made for Chicago. Aboard Lady Elgin, Captain Wilson ordered that cattle and cargo be thrown overboard to lighten the load and raise the gaping hole in Lady Elgin's port side above water level while the steward was down in the coal bunker trying to stop the leak with mattresses. Captain Wilson ordered a lifeboat lowered on the starboard side to check the extent of the damage but it never regained the steamer. Within twenty minutes, Lady Elgin broke apart, and all but the bow section rapidly sank. The night was lit up at intervals by flashes of lightning showing the scattered wreckage.

The life preservers, 2 in (5.1 cm) hardwood planks, 5 ft (1.5 m) long and 18 in (46 cm) wide, were never used. Two boats with a total of 18 people reached shore. In addition, fourteen people were saved on a large raft and many others on parts of the wreckage. Over 300 people died and 98 were saved. The drummer of the German band, Charles Beverung, saved himself by using his large bass drum as a life preserver. Survivors reported the heroic efforts of Captain Wilson to save about 300 people collected on a raft. When day broke, between 350 and 400 passengers and crew were drifting in stormy waters, holding on to anything they could, many only to be pulled under by breakers near shore.

Students from Northwestern University and Garrett Biblical Institute were watching the shore on the morning of September 8, looking for survivors. One student, Edward Spencer, is credited with rescuing 17 passengers over the course of six hours. He sustained injuries during his rescue efforts that left him an invalid for the rest of his life. A plaque in his honor was first placed in the Northwestern University Gymnasium, and is now housed in the Northwestern University Library.

About 300 people died in the sinking, including Captain Wilson, who was lost trying to save two women when he was caught by the surf and forced into the rocks. Most were from Milwaukee, with the majority of those being from the Irish communities, including nearly all of Milwaukee's Irish Union Guard. So many Irish-American political operatives died that day that the disaster has been credited with transferring the balance of political power in Milwaukee "from the Irish to the Germans". It is said that more than 1000 children were orphaned by the tragedy; however, research shows that fewer than 40 children were orphaned. The Lady Elgin disaster remains the greatest loss of life on open water in the history of the Great Lakes.

Among the 300 victims was Herbert Ingram, the founder and owner of the Illustrated London News and a member of Parliament, who with his son, were the only foreigners on the ship. Ingram was the most wealthy and prominent individual to perish on a shipwreck in the Great Lakes.

== Memorials ==
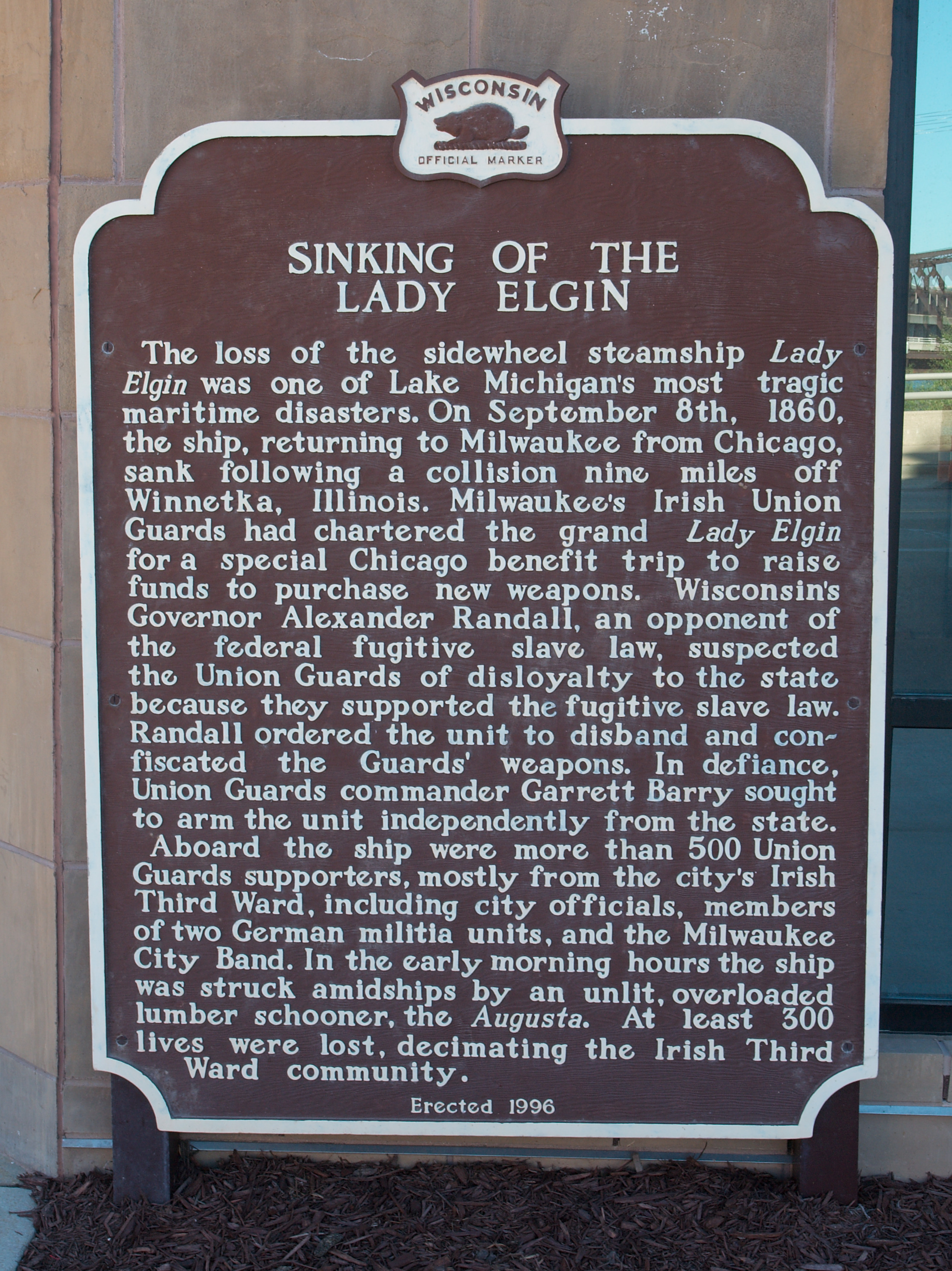
State of Wisconsin Historical Marker for Lady Elgin

A Wisconsin historical marker in the historic third ward in Milwaukee commemorates the tragedy. Calvary Cemetery in Milwaukee has a monument dedicated to the Lady Elgin disaster and the many lost in the tragedy who are buried there.

A statue of Herbert Ingram, politician and owner of the Illustrated London News, the Lady Elgin's most notable victim, stands in the city center in Boston, Lincolnshire, England, since erected in 1862. The monument honours Boston-born, three-term member of Parliament, who helped bring fresh water, education, and the railroad to the city.

Songwriter Henry Clay Work wrote the memorial song "Lost on the 'Lady Elgin'" in 1861. For many years in central Canada this song was sung at family gatherings and social occasions.

In 2009, the Milwaukee Irish Heritage and Cultural Center launched a $200,000 (Note: equivalent to $300,140 in 2025) fundraising campaign for a mammoth, two-story bronze memorial statue for the Lady Elgin disaster.

== Maritime rulings ==
Following the sinking, Lady Elgin's owner, Gurdon Saltonstall Hubbard, received a $12,000 (Note: equivalent to $430,000 in 2025) payment from his insurance company, but neither he nor the insurance company accepted abandonment of the ship. The captain of Augusta, Darius Malott, was arrested and tried in Chicago, but found not guilty of navigational negligence. A coroner's jury declared his second-mate, Mr. Budge, to be incompetent, and his crew to be of principal blame. However, Professor Mason and Lieutenant Bartlett asserted that a principal cause of the collision was the lack of a $15 lantern on the Augusta. Steamboat historian Peter Charlebois noted that, after the investigation, Captain Malott and Lady Elgin's crew and owners were absolved of any blame. He reported:

The judgement was based on a law that not only gave sail the right of way over steam, but did not require sailing vessels to carry running lights. Apparently Augusta had sighted the passenger steamer twenty minutes before the collision but in the rain had misjudged the distance between them. Four years after the disaster, in 1864, a new ruling was made requiring sailing vessels to carry running lights. Since there were still nearly 1,900 ships under sail by 1870 the regulations were long overdue.

== Wreck ==
The wreck of Lady Elgin was discovered in 1989 off Highland Park, Illinois by Harry Zych. Zych claimed ownership of the wreck in a legal action begun in 1989 and provided a list to the court of the 130+/- artifacts that he had recovered. In addition, he testified that he had located the ship's safe lying on the bottom and inside found two gold pocket watches and 70 gold and silver coins that had been entrusted to the purser for safekeeping. He was awarded ownership in 1999 after a protracted legal battle.

While the case was ongoing, the State of Illinois sought the pro-bono services of the Underwater Archaeological Society of Chicago, which under the leadership of archaeological diver Valerie van Heest undertook a reconnaissance survey of the wreck site in 1992. The wreck, consisting of four main debris fields (bow, boilers, paddlewheels, debris field) lying in 50 and 60 feet (15 and 18 m) of water. During their survey, the dive team recorded evidence that other divers had been stripping the wreck of loose artifacts left behind by Zych. Zych never donated his artifacts to any museum/museums. However, in 2023, it became known that he had given another diver permission to recover artifacts; that person donated some 160 artifacts to the Chicago Maritime Museum for an exhibit, designed by Valerie van Heest, based on her book Lost on the Lady Elgin.

In 2025, it was learned that a trio of divers had recovered a gold pocket watch from the debris field in 1992. Engraving on the watchcase and a wax seal fob with the initials "H. I." provided evidence that the watch had belonged to Herbert Ingram, the most prominent individual among the victims. Valerie van Heest acquired the watch, chain, and fob from the divers. After unsuccessful attempts to find Ingram's surviving descendants, she donated the watch to the Boston Guildhall Museum, the city-run museum in Ingram's birth city of Boston, England, which maintains a statue of Ingram.

== See also ==
- List of maritime disasters in the 19th century
