= Francis Brenton =

British adventurer

- Born: January 17, 1927; West Derby
- Died: 1971 (aged 43–44)
- Occupations: writer, photographer and explorer
- Notable work: "Long sail to Haiti", "The voyage of the Sierra Sagrada; across the Atlantic in a canoe"

Francis Brenton (17 January 1927 – 1971?) was a British adventurer. He gained international reputation as a writer, photographer and explorer.

== Early life ==
Francis Brenton was born in the family home, Adair Road, West Derby. His father Victor Brenton, was a house painter, and his mother Mary Ellen, formerly Flattery, was apparently taking care of the kids. He was "the youngest offspring of a hardworking family of four sons and four daughters" as he is introducing himself in one of the books.

He joined the British Army in February 1945 and was transferred to the Royal Corps of Signals in March 1945. He was discharged on 16 June 1948, after having received the War Medal. From March 1952 to April 1954 he served in the Australian Regular Army including overseas service in Japan and Korea.

== Adventures ==
With no sailing experience, single handed, in 1961, Francis Brenton crossed the ocean first time from Tenerife to Haiti where he was considered a spy, arrested and his boat destroyed. He provided a detailed account of this adventure in his first book Long Sail to Haiti.

After this trip he established himself in Chicago. The Field Museum asked him if he could get a South American canoe for their collection. So in 1966 he purchased two dugout canoes, rigged them as a catamaran and sailed all the way to Chicago. After exhibiting the whole boat on the main floor, the Field Museum kept only one canoe. Francis built a new second canoe out of plywood and the very next year he sailed from Chicago North to Lake Huron, St. Lawrence River. Then, via Newfoundland across the Atlantic with destination Africa. In this trip all his rudimentary navigation instruments failed, he was lost and ran out of water.

Off-course by almost 800 miles he was saved by a German freighter and finally after 106 days he reached his destination. From Africa he wanted to get back to the US in a combination balloon-boat. Unfortunately everything that could go wrong did and the whole balloon project was abandoned. Finally he sailed the "Sierra Sagrada" back to Chicago, this time in only 46 days. This adventure is described in The Voyage of the Sierra Sagrada: Across the Atlantic in a Canoe.

The last documents and information from Francis Brenton are dated 1971 when he tried to sail again to England, and he was lost at sea.

== Works ==
- Francis Brenton (1965). Long sail to Haiti. [With a portrait and maps.] OCLC 3087041.
- Francis Brenton (1969). The voyage of the Sierra Sagrada; across the Atlantic in a canoe. Regnery. OCLC 46142.
