= Friends of the Chicago River =

Non-profit organization

- Formation: 1979
- Headquarters: Chicago
- Executive Director: Margaret Frisbie
- Website: https://www.chicagoriver.org/

Friends of the Chicago River is a non-profit organization that was founded in 1979 to environmentally improve and restore the 156-mile Chicago River and Calumet River system. Friends of the Chicago River works through education and outreach, on the ground projects, and public policy and planning to achieve their goals for the Chicago-Calumet River system and its watershed.

As the only organization solely dedicated to the Chicago-Calumet River system, Friends has spent four decades operating within the Chicago-Calumet River system. Friends, like other environmental organizations, works across sectors and boundaries with elected officials, businesses, frontline organizations, government agencies, municipalities, nonprofits, and volunteers to repair past environmental harm.

== Overview ==
Friends of the Chicago River has 15 full time professional staff; 24 members on its board of directors; and 41,000 members, volunteers, and online activists. Margaret Frisbie has served as executive director of Friends of the Chicago River since 2005. She is a Roman Nomitch Fellow, and was named a National River Hero by River Network in 2017 and a Notable Leader in Sustainability by Crain's Chicago Business in 2022.

== Projects and Achievements ==
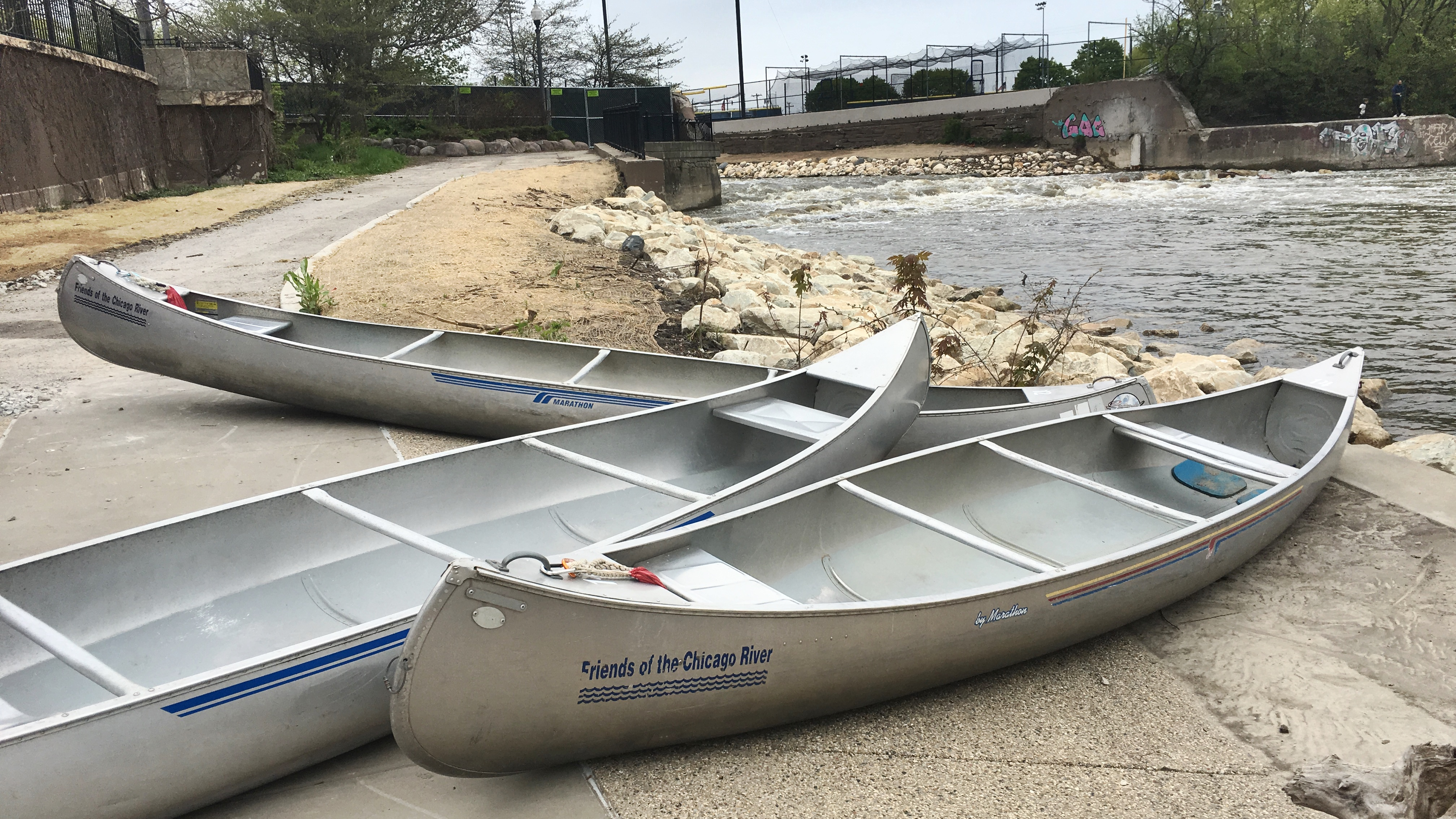
Canoes on the North Branch of the Chicago River

Friends of the Chicago River has engaged in various projects throughout its history. Friends secured the first river protection access ordinance in the City of Chicago in 1983, leading to a regional commitment to a continuous Chicago-Calumet River trail system today. Friends' volunteer canoe program put the first organized cane trips on the water in 1992 before public access was considered acceptable leading to public events such as the Chicago River Flatwater Classic canoe and kayak race that started in 2000. The Flatwater Classic and a report entitled "Waterways for Our Future," published by Friends, Openlands, and the Chicago Civic Federation, led to the establishment of new recreational water quality standards approved in 2011 by the Illinois Pollution Control Board, which protects much of the river system for swimming. The new standards also required sewage effluent disinfection at the Metropolitan Water Reclamation District of Greater Chicago's O'Brien and Calumet water reclamation plants that discharge to the river. A third, Stickney, is the world's largest sewage treatment plant and still does not disinfect despite its common practice nationwide.

In 2002, Friends and Illinois Department of Natural Resources began the Chicago River Dam Removal Program which led to the removal of the North Branch Dam, the Winnetka Road Dam, and a statewide dam removal initiative by Illinois governor Pat Quinn (2009–2015). The Tam O'Shanter Dam in Niles and Chick Evan Dam in Morton Grove are still slated for removal.

Furthering the need for fish habitat, Friends invented the Chicago River Fish Hotel, the first floating wetland in the Chicago-Calumet River System in 2004. In 2013, Friends and Illinois Department of Natural Resources invented and installed 400 channel catfish nesting cavities. Friends also secured funding for fish habitat at the Jetty on the Chicago Riverwalk and launched an instream native planting project using highly adaptive water willow and lizard's tail to provide habitat for aquatic organisms, protect shoreline from bank erosion, create shelter for aquatic life during floods, and improve the aesthetics of the river for recreational users, adapted from a successful program on the Fox River. These native species are tolerant of changing water levels and spread via rhizome to form much larger colonies. In 2023, Friends received a National Fish & Wildlife Foundation Coastal Resilience Fund grant of $630,000 to expand this project to the entire 156 mile system.

In 2013, Friends and Openlands released “Our Liquid Asset: The Economic Benefits of a Clean Chicago River,” an economic analysis which found that for every $1 spent on clean water infrastructure and public open space there is a $1.70 return on investment from individual income, taxes, corporate revenue, and jobs.

In 2017, Friends and Cook County Commissioner Josina Morita (13th District), then a Metropolitan Water Reclamation District Commissioner, hosted the inaugural Big Jump to demonstrate the health and future for swimming in the Chicago-Calumet River system. First-year jumpers from all levels of government include U.S. congresswoman Jan Schakowsky (IL-9), U.S. congressman Mike Quigley (IL-5), Cook County Board President Toni Preckwinkle and Friends' Executive Director Margaret Frisbie.

In 2021, Friends received the Dr. George B. Rabb Force of Nature Award for successfully reconnecting the Mill Creek to the Cal-Sag Channel. This project resulted in the immediate colonization of the high quality creek by five new species and helped to restore the adjacent land through invasive plant removal and addition of new native shrubs and trees. The project partners were Friends, the Forest Preserves of Cook County (FPCC), the Illinois Department of Natural Resources (IDNR), and the Metropolitan Water Reclamation District of Greater Chicago.

Friends of the Chicago River and the Forest Preserves of Cook County have worked together on countless restoration projects including at Beaubien Woods, Blue Star Woods, Chipilly Woods, Crooked Creek, Kickapoo Woods, McClaughrey Springs Woods, Skokie Lagoons, Somme Woods, Wampum Lake, Watersmeet Woods, and Whistler Woods among others and included the specific investment in the nesting success of turtle, osprey, and bat species. Rehabilitation activities for turtle habitats began in 2014 and resulted in an astonishing result of an increase from zero to 60% in nesting success.

Friends of the Chicago River also documents the impact of its restoration work with annual Natural Areas Assessment Surveys that have shown continued improvement of the native plant community in the places where Friends has worked.

In 2023 Friends of the Chicago River received a Chicago Innovation award as a climate champion for the Natural Solutions Tool they developed through the Greater Chicago Watershed Alliance in partnership with the Trust for Public Land. The Tool also won a 2023 Dr. George B. Rabb Force of Nature Award from the Chicago Wilderness Alliance. Friends has received over 50 awards since its founding in 1979.

== Public policy and planning ==
Friends' Public Policy and Planning has programs to solve the long-term complex problems the river systems faces in various areas, including:

=== Impaired water quality ===
- Combined sewer overflows: untreated sewage is discharged into the Chicago-Calumet River system during severe storms
- Stormwater runoff: pollutants from roofs and pavement run into the river during rain events
- Nutrient pollution: excess phosphorus and nitrogen harm aquatic wildlife
- Lack of dissolved oxygen: poor water quality lowers dissolved oxygen that aquatic life require
- Excessive chlorides: excessive use of road salts harm our waters and aquatic wildlife
- Litter / floatables: plastics and other trash flow into the river system during rain events

=== Threatened habitat and wildlife ===
- Invasive species: nonnative plants and wildlife crowd out native species and reduce biodiversity
- Degraded habitat and fragmentation: urban development isolates habitats, lessening biodiversity
- Loss of open space: the risk of losing valuable open spaces increases as development pressure expands
- Increasingly endangered species: habitat loss and fragmentation threaten the existence of many species

=== Responsible river edge development ===
- Lack of river-friendly design: too often the river is treated as a water feature, not a living natural resource full of life
- Lack of public access: many areas still do not have public access to the river's edge
- Inconsistent treatment of the river edge setback: some developments lack amenities required by Chicago's 2019 guidelines
- Impervious surfaces: with increasing development along the river, hard surfaces increase stormwater reaching the river

=== Public access and community engagement ===
- Inequity in recreational access: not enough neighborhoods, especially on the south and southwest sides of Chicago have access
- Disconnected trail systems: the many paths, existing or planned, do not yet create a continuous system
- Unaware of river recreational opportunities: there is no single resource about recreation on the river
- Priority is given to commercial operations: despite rules saying otherwise, barges and large tour boats get the right of way

== Other select programs ==
=== Chicago River Schools Network ===
Since its inception, the Chicago River Schools Network (CRSN) has partnered with K-12 teachers to introduce over 475,000 students to the history, ecology, and health of the river. Friends' staff provide training and support for educators, sharing techniques and strategies to engage students in environmental issues and activities solving everyday problems the river faces. Friends also provides individual support with curricula and lesson plans, classroom presentations, field trips, equipment loans, and workshops.

=== Greater Chicago Watershed Alliance ===
Friends of the Chicago River initiated the Greater Chicago Watershed Alliance in 2020 to establish a cross jurisdictional forum that would result in the expanded use of nature-based solutions to manage stormwater which will reduce combined sewer overflows, community flooding, the urban heat island effect, air pollution while building climate resilience, protecting wildlife and their habitats, and improving public health and wellness.

The 25+ member Watershed Alliance includes various partners, including the stormwater agencies for Cook and Lake Counties, Alliance for the Great Lakes, Center for Neighborhood Technology, City of Chicago, Chicago Park District, the Chicago Metropolitan Agency for Planning, Chicago Wilderness Alliance, Department of Illinois Natural Resources, Forest Preserves of Cook County, the Illinois Coastal Zone Program, The Nature Conservancy, Openlands, Trust for Public Land, and The Wetlands Initiative who all serve in a volunteer capacity on the steering committee.

=== Bridgehouse & Chicago River Museum ===
The McCormick Bridgehouse & Chicago River Museum is a program of Friends of the Chicago River that aims to educate visitors about the history and ecology of the Chicago River. The museum is located in the southwest tower of the Michigan Avenue Bridge in Chicago. Visitors to the museum can learn about the engineering and architecture of the bridge, as well as the history of the Chicago River and its impact on the city. The museum features exhibits on the ecology of the river, including the wildlife that inhabits it, and the efforts being made to restore its health.

=== Chicago River Day ===
Friends of the Chicago River founded Chicago River Day in 1992. This annual clean-up day activates more than 2,000 volunteers working along the river at over 80 city and suburban locations, and serves an activation for increased river stewardship for people of all ages. Event activities include removing 80 tons of garbage and invasive plants, repairing river-edge trails, and implementing habitat improvement projects. Nearly 2 million pounds of garbage and invasive plant material have been removed since it was founded.
