= SS Wisconsin =

Iron-hulled package steamer that sank in Lake Michigan

- WISCONSIN shipwreck (iron steamer)
- U.S. National Register of Historic Places
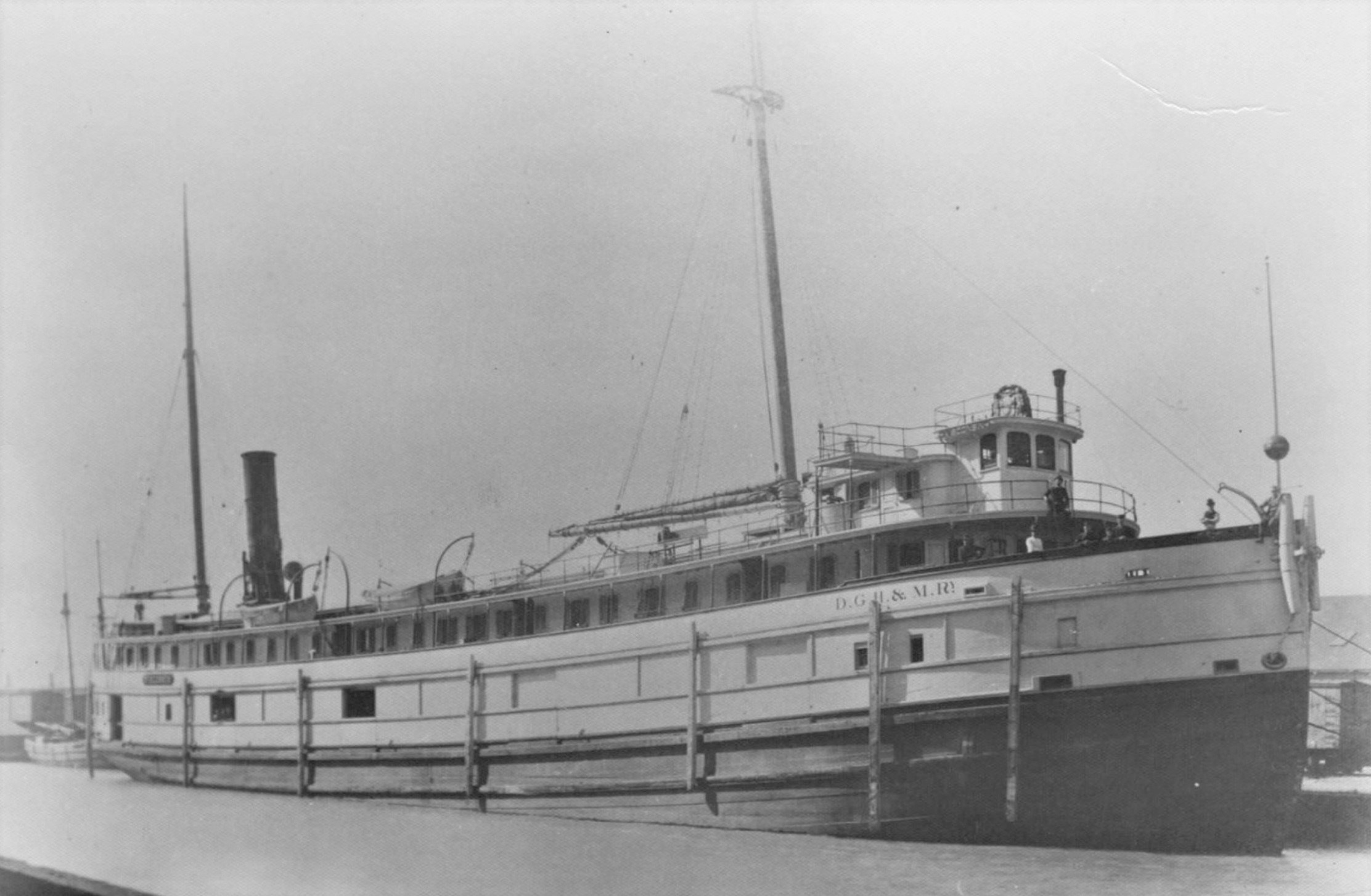
- The Wisconsin when she was owned by the Grand Haven & Milwaukee Transportation Company

- Location within Wisconsin
- Location: Lake Michigan off the coast of Kenosha, Wisconsin
- Coordinates: 42°31′57.66″N 87°42′31.44″W
- NRHP reference No.: 09000820
- Added to NRHP: October 7, 2009

Wisconsin was an iron-hulled package steamer built in 1881 that sank in 1929 in Lake Michigan off the coast of Kenosha, Wisconsin, United States. In 2009 the shipwreck site was added to the National Register of Historic Places.

== Career ==
The Wisconsin was built for the Goodrich Line at the Detroit Dry Dock Complex in 1881, a steamer 204 feet (62 m) long with a beam of 35 feet (11 m) and a depth of 12 feet (3.7 m). Her design was progressive in several ways. She had an iron hull in an era when most ships were still built of wood. That hull was a double hull, with a max 3.8-foot space between the iron outer hull and the iron floor of the hold. This 3.8-foot space between the hulls was divided into five watertight compartments, which could be independently filled or emptied with ballast water, to adjust for light loads or top-heavy loads. Her front was clad with a rounded iron forefoot which could be pushed up onto ice floes so the ship's weight could break through. The Wisconsin and her sister ship Michigan were the first double-hulled iron steamers on the Great Lakes.

In 1885, the Wisconsin caught fire off Grand Haven, Michigan and was nearly destroyed. The Wisconsin was renamed the Naomi in 1899. On May 27, 1907, the ship caught fire again; the steamers Kansas, E. G. Kerr, and Saxona rescued most of the people on board, but four crew members and one passenger perished. By 1910 the ship was known as the E. G. Crosby.

During World War I, the Crosby was commandeered by the United States Navy and served in New York harbor as a convalescent hospital ship named the General Robert M. O'Reilly after Robert Maitland O'Reilly, a former Surgeon General of the United States Army. The General Robert M. O'Reilly was renamed the Pilgrim in 1920 before returning to her original owners and name in 1924.

== Sinking and legacy ==
On 29 October 1929, the Wisconsin left Chicago bound for Milwaukee. Under the command of Captain Dougal Morrison, the freighter was carrying passengers, automobiles, and machine tools. The ship ran into a storm and began taking on water, sinking around 7:10 pm. Rescue craft arrived 20 minutes later. Estimates of the number saved and lost vary widely, from 18 lost out of 26 aboard to 18 lost of 76 aboard. Estimates given around the time of the sinking give numbers of around 63-66 saved, 8-10 dead or missing. Sources agree the captain went down with the ship.

Lake Michigan Wreck Dive - SS Wisconsin, Waukegan, IL (north of Chicago), summer 2012

The wreck site is a popular location for historians, archaeologists and divers. It lies in 90 to 130 feet (27 to 40 m) of water, 6.5 miles (10.5 km) south-southeast of Kenosha.
