= Michigan Shipwreck Research Association =

Nonprofit organization

MSRA logo

Michigan Shipwreck Research Association (MSRA) is an American non-profit corporation based in Holland, Michigan. Formed in 2001 by the former directors of the committee which originally established the Southwest Michigan Underwater Preserve, their stated purpose is to "Preserve Michigan’s Submerged Maritime History." With the discovery of the steamer H. C. Akeley outside the boundaries of the preserve, the group broadened their area of focus and formed MSRA.

MSRA has worked with a number of affiliates, including the National Oceanic and Atmospheric Administration, the Great Lakes Environmental Research Laboratory, the United States Coast Guard, the University of Michigan, and the Michigan State Police. Other affiliates include authors, archaeologists, oceanographers, marine engineers, historians, and explorers. MSRA has conducted joint operations with David Trotter's Undersea Research Associates (URA) and Clive Cussler's National Underwater and Marine Agency (NUMA).

Founding and current board members include Craig Rich, Valerie (Olson) van Heest, Jack van Heest, and Neel Zoss. Rich and the van Heests serve as part of the MSRA Dive Team. The technical dive team has consisted of Jeff Vos, Todd White, and Bob Underhill. They also do the majority of the underwater photography and videography.

== Activities ==
Until 1998, when MSRA began regular side-scan survey work, the waters off the coast of West Michigan were some of the least explored in the Great Lakes. Until then, there were only a few wreck locations known and regularly dived, including the Ironsides off Grand Haven, Michigan, and the Havana off Benton Harbor, Michigan, as well as a scuttled fireboat off Saugatuck, Michigan.

The waters off West Michigan are not sheltered with harbors like so many other areas in Michigan. Prevailing west and northwest winds have scoured out the bottom, creating one of the deepest areas in the lake. While just across the lake, off Chicago and Milwaukee, the water is as shallow as 100 feet ten miles offshore, the Michigan side drops off to that depth only three miles from shore. This condition may be the limiting factor in shipwreck discoveries. Discoveries are usually made by scuba divers interested in diving on virgin wrecks. Until recent advances in technical diving, which now allow divers to go deeper for longer, shipwreck hunters paid very little attention to the region off West Michigan due to its excessive depth.

Detailed examination of the submerged wreckage provides valuable insights into the vessel’s loss and stories of the death.

MSRA began conducting annual 10-day shipwreck search expeditions in 1998 during the spring months when conditions on the lake are best for side-scan survey operations. From that time until 2018, the organization utilized the services of shipwreck hunter and side scan sonar operator David Trotter. Additionally, from 2004 until 2017, the MSRA partnered with author and explorer Clive Cussler of the nonprofit National Underwater Marine Agency and his side scan survey expert Ralph Wilbanks and his associate Steve Howard to conduct an additional expedition each year in search of the lost Northwest Airlines DC-4 Flight 2501. In 2018, the MSRA acquired its own sonar through donations from its members and supporters. Since 1998, the team has jointly covered over 800 square miles of bottomlands off West Michigan.

During the winter of 2011–2012, MSRA took advantage of cyclically low Great Lakes water levels and surveyed the hulks of a half dozen shipwrecks in the Grand River near Harbor Island at Grand Haven. The group identified the L.L. Barth and the largest of them as the Aurora.

In 2011, MSRA conducted an extensive archaeological survey of the wreck of the Thomas Hume located far off New Buffalo, Michigan, in Illinois waters. The work resulted in a book, museum exhibit, and public event.

MSRA surveyed in 2015 the three freighters that sank in the Armistice Day Storm of 1940, the William B. Davock, Novadoc, and Anna C. Minch.

MSRA surveyed a wreck that became exposed at the White Lake Channel mouth in Muskegon in December 2019, and identified it as the schooner Contest.

Since 1998, the MSRA team has hosted an annual film festival called Mysteries and Histories Beneath the Inland Seas in the spring in Holland, Michigan. 2025 marked its 25th annual event.

MSRA served as a curatorial partner to exhibit designers Lafferty van Heest and Associates to supply research and images to the Michigan Maritime Museum to develop the exhibit "Mysteries Beneath the Waves: Wrecks of the Sunset Coast." The exhibit moved to the Port of Ludington Maritime Museum in 2017, where it remained until 2024.

MSRA served as a curatorial partner to exhibit designers Lafferty van Heest and Associates to supply research and images to the Michigan Maritime Museum to develop exhibit. That exhibit has moved to the Yankee Air Museum in 2020.

== Discoveries ==
- H. C. Akeley, cargo steam ship. Lost in 1883. Discovered 2001, off Saugatuck, Michigan.
- Steel barge, appears to have been scuttled. Discovered 2004, off Holland, Michigan. (named Trotter's Barge after David Trotter, whose side scan services were retained by MSRA at the time of the discovery).
- Ann Arbor No. 5, railroad carferry turned barge. Discovered in 2005 in collaboration with NUMA, off South Haven, Michigan.
- Michigan, passenger steam ship. Lost 1885. Found 2005.
- Chris Craft, 25-foot. Appears to have been scuttled. Discovered 2005 in collaboration with NUMA.
- Hennepin, the first self-unloader in the world. Lost due to leaking August 1927. Discovered 2006.
- Steel barge, appears to have been scuttled. Discovered in 2006 off Port Sheldon, Michigan. Called Potter's Barge by MSRA after the fishermen who first saw target on their bottom finder.
- Hamilton, schooner. Lost in storm November 1873. Discovered 2007 off Saugatuck, Michigan.
- Joseph P. Farnan, steam barge. Lost to fire 1889. Discovered in 2008 in collaboration with NUMA, off South Haven, Michigan.
- A.P. Dutton, schooner. Lost in storm in 1868. Discovered in 2008 in collaboration with NUMA, off South Haven, Michigan.
- Hattie Wells, steam barge. Lost in a storm 1912. Discovered in 2009 in collaboration with NUMA, off South Haven, Michigan.
- William Tell, schooner, burned and sank 1869. Discovered 2009 in collaboration with NUMA, off South Haven, Michigan.
- Small steel barge, vandalized and sunk in 1970s. Discovered in 2009 in collaboration with NUMA, off South Haven, Michigan.
- Schooner, 100-feet-long, unidentified, possibly St. Peter. Discovered in 2011 off Grand Haven, Michigan.
- Sloop, 45-feet long, Unidentified, possibly New Buffalo. Discovered in 2011, in collaboration with NUMA, off Glenn, Michigan.
- Houseboat, 60-foot. Appears to have been scuttled. Found off Saugatuck, Michigan. Discovered 2015 in collaboration with NUMA off Saugatuck, Michigan.
- John V. Moran, passenger steamship. Lost in ice 1899. Discovered in 2015 off Muskegon, Michigan.
- Lizzie Throop, schooner, Lost in storm October 1873. Discovered in 2017 in collaboration with NUMA.
- Milwaukee, steam barge, Lost in a collision 1886. Discovered in 2023.

All shipwrecks in the Great Lakes belong to the individual states in which they have come to rest. While laws are in place that make it illegal to remove anything from a shipwreck site, the discovery of a new site opens it up to the potential of pillaging and disturbance. MSRA generally makes public the locations of the shipwrecks it finds and encourages responsible diving on these historic sites.

== See also ==
- Underwater Archaeological Society of Chicago
