= Chicago Maritime Museum =

Museum in Chicago, Illinois, US

Coordinates: 41.8308°N 87.6563°W

- Established: June 2016
- Location: 1200 W 35th St, Chicago, IL 60609

The Chicago Maritime Museum is a maritime society and museum dedicated to the study and memorialization of Chicago's maritime traditions. The museum's webpage asserts that Lake Michigan and the Chicago River were key factors in Chicago's growth toward status as a world-class city, and pays tribute to Congress for granting lake frontage in 1818 to the infant state of Illinois. The museum opened in June 2016.

== History ==
Chicago's maritime history hit its first peak during the "Golden Age" of the American steamboat. Prior to and during the Civil War era, small but fast (in comparison with previous technology) palace steamers carried passengers and freight over the Great Lakes to Chicago. Canal boats, meanwhile, paraded up and down the newly dug Illinois and Michigan Canal from Chicago to the Illinois River and even the Mississippi. Maritime freight traffic enabled Chicago to make a fast recovery from the Great Chicago Fire of 1871. According to the Chicago Maritime Museum, Chicago's ship-docking operations in 1872 exceeded that of any other port in the United States.

With the growth of diesel-powered truck traffic, Chicago's maritime heritage was at risk in the 20th century. Urban redevelopment efforts, inspired by architect Daniel Burnham and his 1909 Plan of Chicago, bulldozed down many dockside warehouses and working loft buildings. Much of the downtown dock space was redeveloped as Wacker Drive. Advocates call for a second peak of Chicago maritime history in the 21st century, this time oriented toward upper-class housing and waterway-oriented lifestyle experiences.

== Description ==
The Chicago Maritime Society began its collecting activity in 1982. In 1980s, the Society briefly opened a temporary museum at the North Pier Terminal in Chicago. During its early years, the Maritime Society worked closely with the Lake Michigan diving community (See "Affiliated groups"). The society continued developing its collection, eventually taking in more than 6,000 items of tangible maritime heritage. In the early 2000s, the Society opened a museum on Chicago's South Side. The Maritime Museum operates adjacent to the South Fork of the South Branch of the Chicago River. The South Fork is commonly called Bubbly Creek. The museum's riverside location has inspired it to take a broad view of Chicago's maritime heritage. Its website states that the facility celebrates not only Chicago's primary lake and river, but also traditionally industrial Lake Calumet and the city's "beaches, deep tunnels, and pumping stations." The museum's Bridgeport location pays tribute to a neighborhood that began with Chicago's Irish American canal-digging navvies, a key support group within the city's maritime history. The Chicago Maritime Museum is located at 1200 West 35th Street. An admission fee is charged.

=== Affiliated groups ===
The Underwater Archeological Society of Chicago (UASC), a separate organization, is descended from divers who helped found the Chicago Maritime Society and worked within the original Society to get support for projects such as the documentation of schooner David Dows. The UASC maintains an affiliation with the Chicago Maritime Society.

== See also ==
- List of maritime museums in the United States
