= A Cancri =

The Bayer designation A Cancri is shared by two star systems in the constellation Cancer:

- A^{1} Cancri (45 Cancri)
- A^{2} Cancri (50 Cancri)

== See also ==
- α Cancri
