= SS Woodbridge N. Ferris =

Liberty ship of WWII

History

United States
- Name: Bushrod Washington, before 14 October 1942; Woodbridge N. Ferris, renamed 14 October 1942
- Namesake: Bushrod Washington; Woodbridge N. Ferris
- Owner: War Shipping Administration (WSA)
- Operator: Calmar Steamship Corp.
- Ordered: as type (EC2-S-C1) hull, MCE hull 931
- Awarded: 30 January 1942
- Builder: Bethlehem-Fairfield Shipyard, Baltimore, Maryland
- Cost: $1,077,871
- Yard number: 2081
- Way number: 12
- Laid down: 2 December 1942
- Launched: 28 December 1942
- Completed: 15 January 1943
- Identification: Call sign: KKFZ
- Fate: Laid up in Reserve Fleet, 6 December 1946, sold and renamed 18 March 1965

United States
- Owner: Zidell Explorations
- Renamed: Twin Harbor
- Fate: Scrapped 2010
- Notes: Ship used in lighter service

General characteristics
- Class & type: Liberty ship; type EC2-S-C1, standard
- Tonnage: 10,865 LT DWT; 7,176 GRT
- Displacement: 3,380 long tons (3,434 t) (light); 14,245 long tons (14,474 t) (max)
- Length: 441 feet 6 inches (135 m) oa; 416 feet (127 m) pp; 427 feet (130 m) lwl
- Beam: 57 feet (17 m)
- Draft: 27 ft 9.25 in (8.4646 m)
- Installed power: 2 × Oil fired 450 °F (232 °C) boilers, operating at 220 psi (1,500 kPa); 2,500 hp (1,900 kW)
- Propulsion: 1 × triple-expansion steam engine, (manufactured by General Machinery Corp., Hamilton, Ohio); 1 × screw propeller
- Speed: 11.5 knots (21.3 km/h; 13.2 mph)
- Capacity: 562,608 cubic feet (15,931 m^{3}) (grain); 499,573 cubic feet (14,146 m^{3}) (bale)
- Complement: 38–62 USMM; 21–40 USNAG
- Armament: Varied by ship; Bow-mounted 3-inch (76 mm)/50-caliber gun; Stern-mounted 4-inch (102 mm)/50-caliber gun; 2–8 × single 20-millimeter (0.79 in) Oerlikon anti-aircraft (AA) cannons and/or, 2–8 × 37-millimeter (1.46 in) M1 AA guns

SS Woodbridge N. Ferris was a Liberty ship built in the United States during World War II. She was named after Woodbridge N. Ferris, an American educator from Spencer, New York, who served as the 28th governor of Michigan and in the United States Senate as a Democrat. He was the founder and namesake of Ferris State University.

== Construction ==
Woodbridge N. Ferris was laid down on 12 December 1942, under a Maritime Commission (MARCOM) contract, MCE hull 931, by the Bethlehem-Fairfield Shipyard, Baltimore, Maryland; she was launched on 28 December 1942.

== History ==
She was allocated to the Calmar Steamship Corp., on 15 January 1943.

She was briefly handed over to Japan, on 4 February 1946. On 6 December 1946, she was laid up in the Astoria Reserve Fleet, in Astoria, Oregon. On 11 February 1965, she was sold, along with her sister ship turned Acubens-class general stores issue ship, Cybele, for a lump sum of $118,016.16, to Zidell Explorations Inc., to be scrapped. On 24 September 1965, she was renamed Twin Harbor and put into barge service. In August 2010, she was scrapped, along with her sister ship SS Mahlon Pitney, in Tacoma, Washington.

== Bibliography ==
- "Bethlehem-Fairfield, Baltimore MD". www.ShipbuildingHistory.com. 7 August 2021.
- Maritime Administration. "Woodbridge N. Ferris". Ship History Database Vessel Status Card. U.S. Department of Transportation, Maritime Administration.
- Davies, James (May 2004). "Specifications (As-Built)" (PDF). p. 23.
- "SS Woodbridge N. Ferris".
- Carson, Rob (4 August 2010). "World War II Liberty Ships Recycled in Tacoma". News Tribune.
