= Hecuba (disambiguation) =

Hecuba (also known as Hecabe) was the wife of Priam, king of Troy.

Hecuba may also refer to:

- 108 Hecuba, an asteroid
- Hecuba (band), from California
- Hecuba (bivalve), a genus of bivalve molluscs in the family Donacidae
- Hecuba (play), by Euripides
- Hecuba (statue), statue on the University of Southern California's campus
- Hecuba (West play), a 1726 work by the British writer Benjamin West
- Hamlet oder Hekuba: der Einbruch der Zeit in das Spiel, a 1956 essay by Carl Schmitt
- Hécube, Op.177, a 1937 composition by Darius Milhaud
- Hecuba (Passions character), a character from the US soap opera Passions
- Hecuba, a peak in the Nilgiri mountains
- USS Hecuba (AKS-12), a ship
- Hecuba, in the 2009 movie Drag Me to Hell, was a cat belonging to character Clay Dalton's parents, Leonard and Trudy.
