= USS Gratia =

Cargo ship of the United States Navy

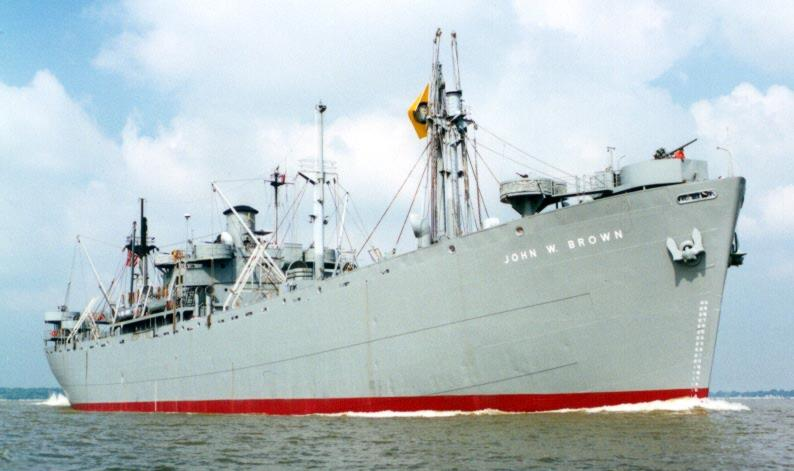
- Gratia was a standard liberty ship, similar to SS John W. Brown, seen here.

History

United States
- Name: John W. Draper; Gratia
- Namesake: John W. Draper; The asteroid Gratia
- Ordered: as EC2-S-C1 hull
- Laid down: date unknown
- Launched: 21 October 1944
- Acquired: 20 November 1944
- Commissioned: 5 May 1945
- Decommissioned: 1 July 1946
- Stricken: 1 July 1946
- Fate: Sold for scrapping, 1964

General characteristics
- Displacement: 4,023 t.(lt) 14,350 t.(fl)
- Length: 441 ft 7 in (134.59 m)
- Beam: 56 ft 11 in (17.35 m)
- Draft: 27 ft 7 in (8.41 m)
- Propulsion: reciprocating steam engine, single shaft, 2,500 hp
- Speed: 11 knots (20 km/h)
- Endurance: 17,000 miles
- Complement: 195
- Armament: one 5 in (130 mm) dual purpose gun mount; one single 3 in (76 mm) dual purpose gun mount *eight single 20 mm gun mounts

USS Gratia (AKS-11) was an Acubens-class general stores issue ship commissioned by the U.S. Navy for service in World War II. She was responsible for delivering and disbursing goods and equipment to locations in the war zone.

Gratia (AKS-11) was launched under Maritime Commission contract by Delta Shipbuilding Co., New Orleans, Louisiana, 21 October 1944; sponsored by Mrs. John W. Boatwright; acquired by the Navy 20 November 1944; and commissioned the same day.

== World War II service ==
She remained in commission only long enough to sail to Galveston, Texas, where she decommissioned 3 November to undergo conversion. She recommissioned 5 May 1945 and sailed for the Pacific Ocean as part of Service Squadron 8.

Operating out of Manila, Gratia carried stores and passengers to ports in the Philippines, the Admiralties, and New Guinea. In January 1946, she departed Manila the final time, reaching San Francisco, California, 4 April via various Japanese ports and Pearl Harbor.

== Post-war decommissioning ==
After returning to Pearl Harbor 30 May, Gratia decommissioned there 1 July 1946, and was towed to San Francisco, California. Her name was struck from the Navy Register 17 July 1947, and she was transferred to the Maritime Commission. Gratia was part of the National Defense Reserve Fleet, berthed in Suisun Bay, California, until the fall of 1964 when she was scrapped.
