= USS Sentinel (AM-113) =

Minesweeper of the United States Navy

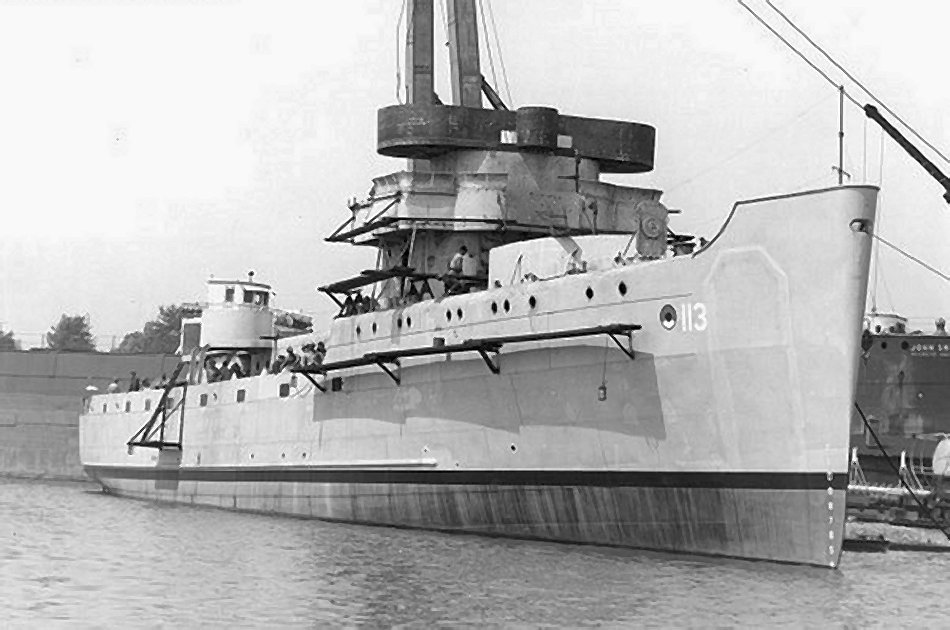
- USS Sentinel (AM-113) under construction

History

United States
- Name: USS Sentinel
- Builder: American Ship Building Company, Cleveland, Ohio
- Laid down: 28 November 1941
- Launched: 23 May 1942
- Commissioned: 3 November 1942
- Stricken: 19 August 1943
- Honours and awards: 2 battle stars (World War II)
- Fate: Sunk in action, 10 July 1943

General characteristics
- Class & type: Auk-class minesweeper
- Displacement: 890 long tons (904 t)
- Length: 221 ft 3 in (67.44 m)
- Beam: 32 ft (9.8 m)
- Draft: 10 ft 9 in (3.28 m)
- Speed: 18 knots (33 km/h; 21 mph)
- Complement: 101 officers and enlisted
- Armament: 1 × 3"/50 caliber gun; 2 × 40 mm guns

USS Sentinel (AM-113) was an Auk-class minesweeper built for the United States Navy during World War II; she was the third U.S. Naval vessel to bear the name. It was laid down on 28 November 1941 by the American Ship Building Company, Cleveland, Ohio; launched on 23 May 1942; and commissioned on 3 November 1942.

== World War II Atlantic Fleet operations ==
Sentinel reported for duty with the Atlantic Fleet on 15 January 1943. The minesweeper experienced her first enemy contact on 20 February while escorting Merak (AF-21) from Bermuda to Norfolk, Virginia when an escorting aircraft dropped a smoke bomb 2,500 yards astern. Picking up suspected submarine wake noise with her echo-ranging equipment, Sentinel attacked on two contacts within a 25-minute period. There was no evidence of damage to the enemy, except for some dark brown or black matter which appeared after the second starboard depth charge exploded.

On 8 March, Sentinel, accompanied by Seer (AM-112), departed Norfolk, Virginia for patrol duty, joined a convoy on the 17th, and anchored at Norfolk the next day. The two minesweepers got underway again on the 19th, and possibly encountered a submarine the next day. They fired depth charges which produced no results, and proceeded to New London, Connecticut. Sentinel spent the remainder of the month in training in Long Island Sound and moored at the Brooklyn Navy Yard.

== North African operations ==
On 5 April, Sentinel resumed patrol duty and escorted LST-360 to Bermuda on the 9th, after standing by stranded LST-72 en route as the latter made repairs. The minesweeper departed Bermuda on the 13th to escort convoy UGL-2 to Europe, arriving at Gibraltar Harbor on the 30th.

From 2 to 4 May, the minesweeper escorted the convoy to the Advanced Amphibious Training Base, Ténès, Algeria, where she remained until sailing for Oran on the 9th.

Sentinel departed Oran on 12 May for anti-submarine patrol until her return on the 16th. The minesweeper got under way again on the 20th, entered the harbor at Philippeville on the 24th, and reached Bizerte, Tunisia, on the 25th.

On 30 May, Sentinel stood out of Bizerte as an escort for Task Group 81.1. After conducting sound and radar search ahead of the convoy, the minesweeper reached Ghazaouet, Algeria, on 2 June. Departing the harbor on the 3rd, Sentinel reached Arseu the same day.

Sentinel continued her escort and patrol duty along the North African coast until 8 July, when she stood out of Bizerte and set her course for the invasion of Sicily.

== Sinking ==
On 10 July, Sentinel was part of Task Group 86.3 tasked with landing in the Licata area. At 0430, while serving on antisubmarine patrol, Sentinel was attacked by German aircraft. At about 0500, a bomb exploded about 200 feet off her starboard quarter. Flares inshore of the minesweeper illuminated her for the unobservable enemy aircraft. At approximately 0510, four or five bombs burst nearby. One opened a hole one foot wide and eight feet long in her after engine room. The damage control party and the after engine room crew were seriously weakened by death and injury, and the radio room and all interior communications, except one sound-powered telephone circuit, were wrecked.

Between 0510 and 0600, the ship was attacked four times more. She repulsed two attacks without being bombed; but, at 0525, attacking aircraft released bombs despite Sentinel's heavy anti-aircraft fire and observable 20 millimeter hits. This attack put the forward 3-inch gun out of action and killed or wounded half its crew. Bridge personnel and the port side 20 millimeter crew were also hit. All communications were lost, the forward engine room was holed, and the steering engine was knocked out. At 0530, one bomb hit put the forward engine out of commission. Sentinel's crew, however, hit two Messerschmitt Me 210 bombers and, at about 0545, effectively used the after 3-inch gun and 20 millimeter guns to repulse one last attack.

By 0615, with all power gone, the badly listing Sentinel contacted Seer (AM-112), and the "Green" beach-master by portable radio using dry cells from hand lanterns. This message brought SC-530, LCI-33, and PC-550 to her assistance at the utmost speed. After the more seriously wounded had been evacuated on LCI-33 and SC-530, it became apparent that the ship would not remain afloat. Her list was about 28° and water was on her main deck when the remainder of her crew boarded PC-550, at no small risk to the submarine chaser which then remained by Sentinel until she capsized at 1030 and went under at 1045.

Sentinel was struck from the Naval Vessel Register on 19 August 1943.
