= USS Iolanda =

Cargo ship of the United States Navy

History

United States
- Name: William A Dobson; Iolanda
- Namesake: William A Dobson; The minor planet Iolanda
- Ordered: as William A Dobson; EC2-S-C1 hull
- Laid down: date unknown
- Launched: 21 October 1944
- Acquired: 31 October 1944
- Commissioned: 31 October 1944
- Decommissioned: 2 November 1944
- In service: 14 June 1945
- Out of service: 11 July 1946
- Stricken: date unknown
- Fate: Scrapped in 1972

General characteristics
- Displacement: 4,023 t.(lt) 14,350 t.(fl)
- Length: 441 ft 7 in (134.59 m)
- Beam: 56 ft 11 in (17.35 m)
- Draught: 27 ft 7 in (8.41 m)
- Propulsion: reciprocating steam engine, single shaft, 2,500hp
- Speed: 11 kts
- Endurance: 17,000 miles
- Complement: 195
- Armament: one 5 in (130 mm) dual-purpose gun mount, one single 3 in (76 mm) dual-purpose gun mount, eight single 20 mm gun mounts

USS Iolanda (AKS-14) was an Acubens-class general stores issue ship commissioned by the U.S. Navy for service in World War II. She was responsible for delivering and disbursing goods and equipment to locations in the war zone.

Iolanda (AKS-14), originally a "liberty ship", was launched by New England Shipbuilding Corporation, South Portland, Maine, 21 October 1944; sponsored by Mrs. J. Gary Jones; acquired and commissioned with a skeleton crew 31 October for transfer to Bethlehem Steel's Simpson Yard, East Boston, Massachusetts. The ship decommissioned 2 November 1944 for conversion to Navy use, and commissioned in full 14 June 1945.

== World War II service ==
Following shakedown in the Chesapeake Bay area, Iolanda arrived Bayonne, New Jersey, 21 July 1945 to load almost 3,000 tons of general stores consisting of the almost 8,000 different items needed by the operating ships of the fleet. She departed 3 August for duty in the western Pacific Ocean and sailing via the Panama Canal Zone and Pearl Harbor arrived Ulithi, America's bustling advance base in the western Carolines. Iolanda steamed into Ulithi 24 September to help supply America's victorious fleet. She steamed from Ulithi 30 September, to provision ships at Okinawa, Shanghai, and Hong Kong.

== End-of-war supply operations ==
The first day of 1946 saw her at Manus loading additional stores, and she departed 1 February to replenish vessels at Guam, Hong Kong, and Shanghai. Iolanda supplied both ships and shore stations in support of the occupation until departing Shanghai 10 April 1946.

== Post-war decommissioning ==
After a stopover at Guam she proceeded to Pearl Harbor, where she decommissioned 11 July 1946. Later towed to San Francisco, California, Iolanda was returned to the Maritime Commission 24 April 1947 and was placed in the National Defense Reserve Fleet, Suisun Bay, California, where she remained until she was scrapped in 1972.

== Military awards and honors ==
Iolanda's crew was eligible for the following medals:

- American Campaign Medal
- Asiatic-Pacific Campaign Medal
- World War II Victory Medal
- Navy Occupation Service Medal (with Asia clasp)
