= USS Castor (AKS-1) =

Cargo ship of the United States Navy

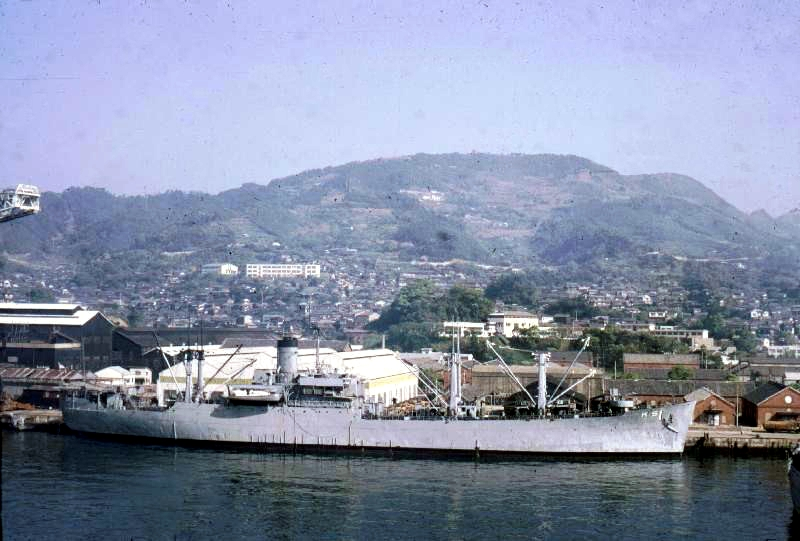
- USS Castor (AKS-1) at Sasebo, Japan, April 1967

History

United States
- Ordered: as SS Challenger; C2-Cargo hull
- Laid down: not known
- Launched: 20 May 1939
- Acquired: 30 October 1940
- Commissioned: 12 March 1941
- Decommissioned: 30 June 1947
- In service: 24 November 1950
- Out of service: 31 October 1968
- Stricken: 1 December 1968
- Fate: Sold for scrapping in September 1969

General characteristics
- Class & type: Castor-class general stores issue ship
- Displacement: 7,350 t.(lt) 13,910 t.(fl)
- Length: 459 ft 2 in (139.95 m)
- Beam: 63 ft (19 m)
- Draught: 26 ft 5 in (8.05 m)
- Propulsion: steam turbine, single shaft, 6,000 shp
- Speed: 16 knots (30 km/h)
- Complement: 315
- Armament: one 5 in (130 mm)/38 dual purpose gun mount, four 3 in (76 mm)/50 gun mounts

USS Castor (AKS-1) was a Castor-class general stores issue ship commissioned by the U.S. Navy for service in World War II. She was responsible for delivering and disbursing goods and equipment to locations in the war zone.

Castor (AKS-1) was launched as SS Challenger on 20 May 1939 by Federal Shipbuilding and Dry Dock Co., Kearny, New Jersey, under a Maritime Commission contract; sponsored by Mrs. T. M. Woodward; acquired by the Navy 23 October 1940 and renamed Castor six days later; and commissioned 12 March 1941.

== World War II Pacific Theatre operations ==
Clearing Norfolk, Virginia, 6 May 1941, Castor arrived at San Diego, California, 20 May to begin a series of cargo voyages to Pearl Harbor. In October, she carried U.S. Marine reinforcements to Johnston Island and Wake Island.

=== Strafed at Pearl Harbor ===
Returning to San Francisco, California, to load explosives, Castor arrived in Pearl Harbor three days before the Japanese attack of 7 December 1941. Her guns were quickly brought into action, and while she was repeatedly strafed by enemy planes, she suffered little damage and no casualties in the attack.

=== Transporting emergency material after start of war ===
Until 7 February 1942, Castor carried cargo from the U.S. West Coast to aid in the buildup of Pearl Harbor as the nerve center for the Pacific Ocean, then aided in the opening of operations in the critical South Pacific area with cargo runs from San Francisco to bases in New Caledonia, the New Hebrides, the Fiji Islands, and New Zealand. A cargo voyage to Funafuti and Espiritu Santo in November and December 1943 found her carrying essential supplies for the Gilbert Islands invasion.

=== Invasion forces support ===
From January 1944, her voyages from the west coast were to bases in the Marshall Islands, and after a brief overhaul at Seattle, Washington, Castor reported at Manus 18 September for duty with famed task force TF 58. Operating primarily from Manus and Ulithi, she replenished the fast carrier task force at sea thus helping to expedite the smashing series of raids which pushed the Japanese ever westward. The final phase of these operations found the cargo ship acting in support of the assault on Okinawa, off which she operated through May and June 1945. Unscathed by the inferno which kamikaze attacks made of duty off Okinawa, Castor sailed for overhaul at San Francisco on 10 July.

=== End-of-war activity ===
Between December 1945 and February 1947, Castor supplied occupation forces in the Far East, calling at Guam, Saipan, Qingdao, Hong Kong, and Japanese ports. She was decommissioned and placed in reserve at San Francisco 30 June 1947.

== Reactivated during Korean War ==
With the outbreak of war in Korea, Castor was recommissioned 24 November 1950, and cleared San Francisco 11 March 1951 for training at Pearl Harbor. She arrived at Sasebo 14 May and from this base supplied ships in the harbors of Inchon and Pusan, Korea, as well as replenishing ships of task force TF 77 at sea.

=== Dead in the water during a bad storm ===
Leaving Yokosuka astern 18 March 1952, Castor ran into a fierce storm which damaged her engines and left her dead in the water for 22 hours until she could be towed back to Japan for emergency repairs. She arrived at San Francisco 25 April for overhaul and permanent repairs.

=== Home port at Yokosuka ===
On 9 September 1952, Castor returned to Yokosuka, now to be her home port. Since that date and through 1962 she has operated from Yokosuka and occasionally from Subic Bay, Philippine Islands, supporting the ever more important operations of U.S. 7th Fleet, as it carries out its assignment to keep the Taiwan Patrol Force at sea, and in September 1954 took part in the Vietnamese evacuation, Operation Passage to Freedom, off Indo-China. An overhaul at San Francisco early in 1955 fitted her to carry both technical and general stores.

== Rescuing typhoon survivors ==
While bound for Subic Bay on 19 October 1956, Castor fought her way unscathed through a furious typhoon, and next day received a distress message from the Philippine merchantman SS Lepus. With the aid of search planes, Castor located and rescued 11 survivors of the stricken ship. This rescue won a citation and plaque for Castor from Philippine President Ramon Magsaysay.

== Vietnam War operations ==
Castor was homeported in Sasebo, Japan during the mid sixties. She made runs to Vietnam, picking up stores in Sasebo, Subic Bay, Philippines and Kaoshung, Taiwan. She and USS Mars (AFS-1)and Castor's sister ship USS Pollux (AKS-4) which was home ported in Yokosuka, Japan were the only commissioned U.S. Naval supply ships serving the Vietnam units until Castor's decommissioning. Pollux was also decommissioned during the Vietnam War (1968).

== Military awards and honors ==
Castor received three battle stars for World War II service:

- Pearl Harbor
- Gilbert Islands operation
- Okinawa Gunto operation

She received two for Korean War service:

- Communist China Spring Offensive
- UN Summer-Fall Offensive

During the Vietnam War she earned the following campaign stars:

- Vietnam Defense
- Vietnamese Counteroffensive
- Vietnamese Counteroffensive - Phase II
- Vietnamese Counteroffensive - Phase III
- Tet Counteroffensive
- Vietnamese Counteroffensive - Phase IV

Her crew was eligible for the following medals and campaign ribbons:

- Combat Action Ribbon (retroactive)
- China Service Medal (extended)
- American Defense Campaign Medal
- American Campaign Medal
- Asiatic-Pacific Campaign Medal (3)
- World War II Victory Medal
- Navy Occupation Service Medal (with Asia clasp)
- National Defense Service Medal (2)
- Korean Service Medal (2)
- Armed Forces Expeditionary Medal (2 Taiwan Straits, 32 Quemoy-Matsu, 11 Vietnam)
- Vietnam Service Medal (6)
- United Nations Service Medal
- Republic of Vietnam Campaign Medal
- Republic of Korea War Service Medal (retroactive)
