= USS Hesperia =

Cargo ship of the United States Navy

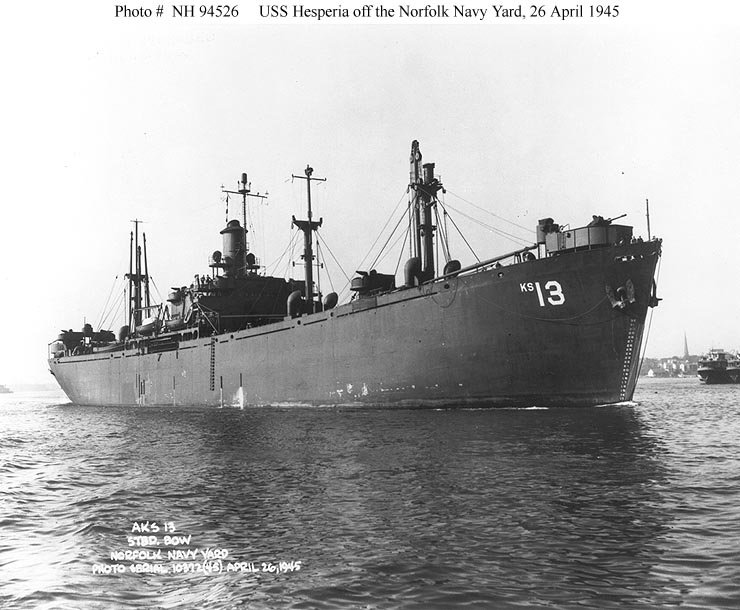

History

United States
- Name: Sam Dale; Hesperia
- Namesake: Sam Dale; The asteroid Hesperia
- Ordered: as Sam Dale; EC2-S-C1 hull, MC hull 2825
- Laid down: 9 October 1944
- Launched: 18 November 1944
- Commissioned: 1 April 1945
- Decommissioned: 27 February 1947
- Fate: Scrapped in 1973

General characteristics
- Class & type: Acubens-class stores ship
- Displacement: 4,023 t.(lt) 14,350 t.(fl)
- Length: 441 ft 7 in (134.59 m)
- Beam: 56 ft 11 in (17.35 m)
- Draft: 27 ft 7 in (8.41 m)
- Installed power: 2,500 hp (1,900 kW)
- Propulsion: reciprocating steam engine, single shaft
- Speed: 11 knots (20 km/h)
- Endurance: 17,000 miles
- Complement: 195
- Armament: 1 × 5 in (130 mm) / 38-caliber dual-purpose gun; 1 × 3 in (76 mm) / 50-caliber dual-purpose gun; 8 × 20 mm anti-aircraft guns (8 × 1)

USS Hesperia (AKS-13) was an Acubens-class general stores issue ship commissioned by the U.S. Navy for service in World War II. She was responsible for delivering and disbursing goods and equipment to locations in the war zone.

Hesperia (AKS-13), built as the Liberty ship SS Sam Dale, was launched under Maritime Commission contract by Delta Shipbuilding Co., New Orleans, Louisiana, 18 November 1944; sponsored by Mrs. Marie Owen; converted to Navy use by Norfolk Naval Shipyard and commissioned 1 April 1945.

== World War II service ==
Following a period of training and shakedown, Hesperia loaded her cargo of general stores for the fleet and sailed 16 May 1945. Transiting the Panama Canal, she arrived Pearl Harbor 13 June 1945. The stores ship then proceeded to the western Pacific for the important job of supplying operating units with some of the thousands of items—from clothing to spare parts—necessary to a modern fighting ship.

She arrived Ulithi 6 July and after issuing stores to the ships present sailed with a convoy for Okinawa, site of the Pacific's largest amphibious assault just 3 months earlier. Hesperia anchored in Buckner Bay, Okinawa, 21 July and began issuing supplies of all kinds to the fleet and shore installations. She continued to function as a mobile supply base, interrupted only by occasional enemy air attacks, until after hostilities ended in mid-August. Having issued her entire stock the ship departed Okinawa 26 August for Manus. She arrived 7 September, loaded another full stock of replacement items, and sailed 22 September.

== Surviving a dangerous typhoon ==
Hesperia encountered the great typhoon which had devastated Okinawa during her voyage to Korea, but after altering course temporarily continued to Jinsen, arriving 17 October. During the next month she serviced nearly 100 ships and small craft engaged in the Korean and Chinese occupations, operating from Jinsen, and later Taku, China. After this vital support duty, allowing the ships to remain on station for longer periods of time, she returned to Guam for a fresh issue 29 November 1945. Loading completed, she sailed 20 December to Yokosuka, Japan, and after her arrival 6 days later issued stores to over 500 ships and small craft and the shore activities connected with the occupation of Japan.

== Post-war activity ==
Her job in Japan temporarily completed, Hesperia got underway 2 March 1946 for the United States, and arrived San Francisco, California, 30 March. During the next months she made two more voyages to supply the fleet, one to Pearl Harbor, the other to Pearl Harbor and Kwajalein.

== Decommissioning ==
Returning to San Francisco 23 December 1946, she decommissioned 27 February 1947, was delivered to the Maritime Commission, and joined the National Defense Reserve Fleet. She was berthed at present at Suisun Bay, California. Final Disposition: she was scrapped in 1973.

== Military awards and honors ==
Hesperia’s crew was eligible for the following medals:

- China Service Medal (extended)
- American Campaign Medal
- Asiatic-Pacific Campaign Medal
- World War II Victory Medal
- Navy Occupation Service Medal (with Asia clasp)
