= Aks 13 =

Aks 13 may refer to:

- Aks 13000, a Norwegian sabotage squad from World War II
- USS Hesperia (AKS-13), a US Navy ship
