= USS Cybele =

Cargo ship of the United States Navy

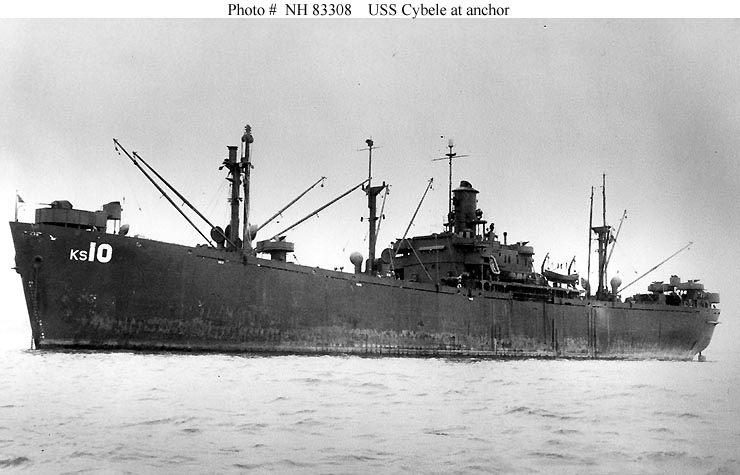
- USS Cybele (AKS-10) at anchor, c. 1945–1946

History

United States
- Name: William Hackett; Cybele
- Namesake: William Stormont Hackett; The asteroid cybele
- Ordered: as SS William Hackett; EC2-S-C1 hull
- Laid down: 29 August 1944
- Launched: 9 October 1944
- Acquired: 14 November 1944
- Commissioned: 16 April 1945
- Decommissioned: 22 August 1946
- Stricken: date unknown
- Fate: Scrapped in April 1965

General characteristics
- Displacement: 4,023 t.(lt) 14,350 t.(fl)
- Length: 441 ft 7 in (134.59 m)
- Beam: 56 ft 11 in (17.35 m)
- Draught: 27 ft 7 in (8.41 m)
- Propulsion: reciprocating steam engine, single shaft, 2,500 hp (1,900 kW)
- Speed: 11 knots (20 km/h; 13 mph)
- Endurance: 17,000 miles
- Complement: 195
- Armament: 1 × 5 in (130 mm) dual-purpose gun mount; 1 × single 3 in (76 mm) dual-purpose gun mount; 8 × single 20 mm gun mounts

USS Cybele (AKS-10) was an Acubens-class general stores issue ship commissioned by the U.S. Navy for service in World War II. She was responsible for delivering and disbursing goods and equipment to locations in the Pacific war zone. The vessel was launched on 9 October 1944 by Delta Shipbuilding Co., New Orleans, Louisiana and entered service with the U.S. Navy on 16 April 1945. The vessel was decommissioned on 22 August 1946 and transferred to the Maritime Commission for disposal on 24 April 1947. The vessel was scrapped in 1965.

== Construction and career ==
Cybele was launched as the Liberty ship SS William Hackett 9 October 1944 by Delta Shipbuilding Co., New Orleans, Louisiana, under a Maritime Commission contract; sponsored by Mrs. H. McCall; transferred to the Navy 14 November 1944; converted at Tampa Shipbuilding Co., Tampa, Florida; and commissioned in full 16 April 1945.

Departing Galveston, Texas, 15 May 1945, Cybele loaded general stores at Bayonne, New Jersey, and sailed 4 June for Pearl Harbor, arriving 30 June. She cleared 13 July for San Pedro Bay, Philippine Islands, where she issued stores to ships until 21 August 1945.

Arriving in Tokyo Bay 31 August 1945, Cybele provided stores for ships engaged in the occupation of Japan until 12 October when she sailed to Samar to load cargo for Qingdao, China.

Between 4 December 1945 and 15 January 1946, Cybele issued general stores at various Japanese ports. After reloading at Saipan, she issued cargo to support the occupation troops at Qingdao and Taku, China, and Jinsen, Korea, until 15 April when she stood out for San Francisco, California, arriving 22 May.

Cybele was decommissioned 22 August 1946 at Pearl Harbor and after being towed back to San Francisco, was transferred to the Maritime Commission for disposal 24 April 1947. She was scrapped in April 1965.

== Military awards and honors ==
Her crew members were eligible for the following medals:

- China Service Medal (extended)
- American Campaign Medal
- Asiatic-Pacific Campaign Medal
- World War II Victory Medal
- Navy Occupation Service Medal (with Asia clasp)
- Philippines Liberation Medal
