= USS Volans =

Cargo ship of the United States Navy

History

United States
- Name: Edward Preble; Volans
- Namesake: Edward Preble; The constellation Volans
- Ordered: as SS Edward Preble; EC2-S-C1 hull, MCE hull 772
- Laid down: 19 October 1942
- Launched: 2 February 1943
- Commissioned: 31 March 1944
- Decommissioned: 17 June 1946
- Stricken: 17 July 1946
- Fate: Scrapped in 1965

General characteristics
- Displacement: 4,023 t.(lt) 14,350 t.(fl)
- Length: 441 ft 7 in (134.59 m)
- Beam: 56 ft 11 in (17.35 m)
- Draught: 27 ft 7 in (8.41 m)
- Propulsion: reciprocating steam engine, single shaft, 2,500hp
- Speed: 11 kts
- Endurance: 17,000 miles
- Complement: 195
- Armament: one 5 in (130 mm) dual-purpose gun mount; one single 3 in (76 mm) dual-purpose gun mount; eight single 20 mm gun mounts

USS Volans (AKS-9) was an Acubens-class general stores issue ship commissioned by the U.S. Navy for service in World War II. She was responsible for delivering and disbursing goods and equipment to locations in the war zone.

Liberty ship SS Edward Preble was laid down under a Maritime Commission contract (MCE hull 772) on 19 October 1942 at South Portland, Maine, by the New England Shipbuilding Corporation; launched on 2 February 1943; sponsored by Miss Beverly Brown; renamed Volans and designated AKS-9 on 13 November 1943; and acquired by the Navy on 2 December 1943. Taken to the Tampa Bay Shipbuilding Co., Inc., Volans was converted for naval service at that yard, the work lasting into the following year. On 31 March 1944, Volans (AKS-9) was commissioned at Tampa, Florida.

== World War II operations ==
Following her shakedown training in Chesapeake Bay and post-shakedown availability at the Norfolk Navy Yard, Volans loaded her initial cargo and got underway for the Panama Canal Zone on 11 May 1944. After transiting the Panama Canal, the stores issue ship experienced a two-day layover at Balboa, on the Pacific Ocean side of the isthmian waterway, before she sailed on 28 May for the New Hebrides Islands.

=== Providing service to the Pacific Fleet ===
Over the next year, Volans performed a vital service to the fleet as a stores issue ship. In the course of her duties, she traveled from port to port, unescorted, proceeding independently from locales ranging from the Solomon Islands to the Carolines; and from the Palaus to the Admiralties. Ports of call included Guadalcanal; Tulagi; Emirau (Green Islands); Noumea, New Caledonia; the Russell Islands; Munda, New Georgia; Espiritu Santo, New Hebrides; Finschhafen and Hollandia, New Guinea; Manus; Ulithi; Kossol Roads; Peleliu; and the islands of Guam and Saipan. In addition, she also operated for a time out of Leyte in the Philippines.

=== A high demand for her goods ===
Volans provided stores to the ships that took part in the initial carrier air strikes on Tokyo in January 1945 and to the ships that took part in landing operations at places such as Iwo Jima, Okinawa, and the Philippines. She serviced some 1,302 ships and facilities, filling 30,454 requisitions comprising an approximate 137,000 items. While at San Pedro Bay, Leyte, from 23 March to 5 April 1945, Volans experienced her busiest service. During that period, she issued supplies on a 24-hour basis, supporting the efforts to secure the Philippines and also to take Okinawa.

=== End-of-war activity ===
On 10 July 1945, Volans departed Ulithi for Seattle, Washington, and shipyard availability and arrived at her destination on 31 July. She was still under overhaul at the time of the Japanese surrender in mid-August and at the time of the formal surrender in Tokyo Bay in early September. On 25 September, Volans sailed for Okinawa and arrived there on 19 October.

== Post-war decommissioning ==
Volans subsequently returned to Pearl Harbor in November and remained there until decommissioned on 17 June 1946. Towed to San Francisco, California, for disposal, the former stores issue ship was delivered to the Maritime Commission at Suisun Bay, California, on 24 June 1947 and placed in the National Defense Reserve Fleet. Her name was struck from the Navy list on 17 July of the same year. Disposition: scrapped in 1965.

== Military awards and honors ==
Volans’ crew members were eligible for the following medals:

- American Campaign Medal
- Asiatic-Pacific Campaign Medal
- World War II Victory Medal
- Navy Occupation Service Medal (with Asia clasp)
- Philippines Liberation Medal
