= USS Hecuba =

Cargo ship of the United States Navy

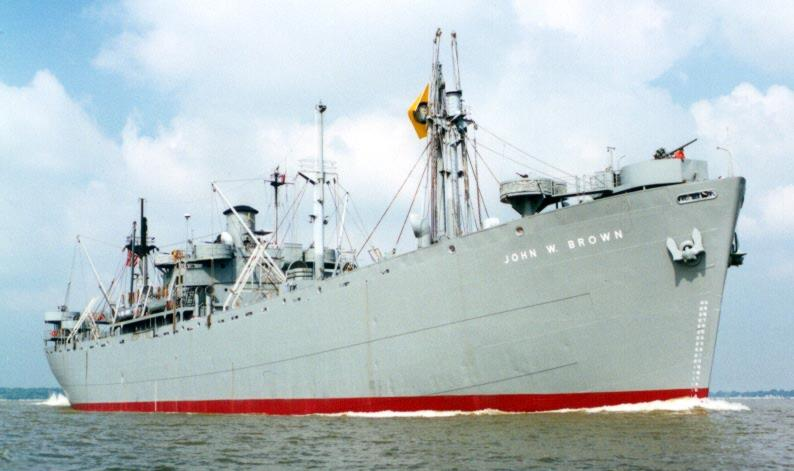
- Hecuba was a standard liberty ship, similar to SS John W. Brown, seen here.

History

United States
- Name: George W. Cable; Hecuba
- Namesake: George W. Cable; The asteroid Hecuba
- Ordered: as SS George W. Cable; EC2-S-C1 hull
- Laid down: date unknown
- Launched: 6 November 1944
- Acquired: date unknown
- Commissioned: 21 April 1945
- Decommissioned: 26 March 1947
- Stricken: date unknown
- Fate: Sold for scrapping, 19 October 1964

General characteristics
- Displacement: 4,023 t.(lt) 14,350 t.(fl)
- Length: 441 ft 7 in (134.59 m)
- Beam: 56 ft 11 in (17.35 m)
- Draught: 27 ft 7 in (8.41 m)
- Propulsion: reciprocating steam engine, single shaft, 2,500 hp
- Speed: 11 knots (20 km/h)
- Endurance: 17,000 miles
- Complement: 195
- Armament: one 5 in (130 mm) dual-purpose gun mount, one single 3 in (76 mm) dual-purpose gun mount, eight single 20 mm gun mounts

USS Hecuba (AKS-12) was an Acubens-class general stores issue ship commissioned by the U.S. Navy for service in World War II. She was responsible for delivering and disbursing goods and equipment to locations in the war zone.

Hecuba (AKS-12), originally Liberty ship SS George W. Cable, was launched by Delta Shipbuilding Co., New Orleans, Louisiana, 6 November 1944 under Maritime Commission contract; sponsored by Mrs. J. Alfred Chard; acquired and converted to Navy use at Todd-Johnson Drydocks Corp.; and commissioned 21 April 1945.

== World War II service ==
Following her conversion to a stores ship and shakedown training, Hecuba departed New Orleans, Louisiana, 31 May 1945 for duty in the Pacific Ocean, arriving Pearl Harbor 22 June. From Hawaii she sailed to the western Pacific, commencing her first issue to the fleet after her arrival at Eniwetok 16 July.

Hecuba arrived back in Pearl Harbor 18 August to reload general supplies for ships of the fleet. She sailed to Ulithi, arriving 10 September, and continued issuing the vital stores at that atoll as well as at Leyte and Okinawa until 28 November 1945. Hecuba departed for San Francisco, California, for additional supplies, only to return to Pearl Harbor 8 February 1946.

== Post-war decommissioning ==
She decommissioned at Pearl Harbor 26 March 1946 and was intended for use in the Pacific atomic tests of that summer, only to be towed to San Francisco, California, in 1947 and placed in the National Defense Reserve Fleet, Suisun Bay, California, where she remained until sold for scrapping to Schintzer Steel Products Co., Portland, Oregon, 19 October 1964.
