= USS Lorain (PF-93) =

1944 Tacoma-class frigate

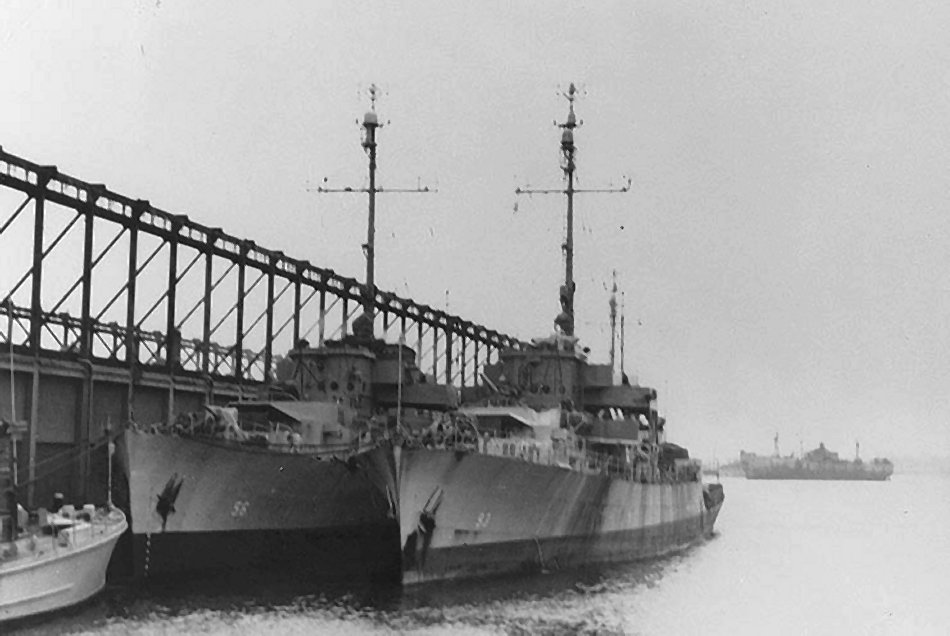
- USS Covington (PF-56) (left) and USS Lorain (right) docked at New York City, 1946, when the ships were on loan to the United States Coast Guard.

History

United States
- Name: USS Roanoke (PG-201)
- Namesake: Roanoke, Virginia
- Reclassified: PF-93, 15 April 1943
- Builder: American Ship Building Company, Lorain, Ohio
- Laid down: 25 October 1943
- Renamed: USS Lorain (PF-93), 7 February 1944
- Namesake: Lorain, Ohio
- Launched: 18 March 1944
- Sponsored by: Mrs. Fred Henderson
- Commissioned: 15 January 1945
- Decommissioned: 14 March 1946
- Fate: Sold to France, 26 March 1947

France
- Name: Laplace (F13)
- Acquired: 26 March 1947
- Reclassified: F713, c. 1952
- Fate: Sunk by a mine, 16 September 1950

General characteristics
- Class & type: Tacoma-class frigate
- Displacement: 1,430 long tons (1,453 t) light; 2,415 long tons (2,454 t) full
- Length: 303 ft 11 in (92.63 m)
- Beam: 37 ft 6 in (11.43 m)
- Draft: 13 ft 8 in (4.17 m)
- Propulsion: 2 × 5,500 shp (4,101 kW) turbines; 3 boilers; 2 shafts
- Speed: 20 knots (37 km/h; 23 mph)
- Complement: 190
- Armament: 3 × 3"/50 caliber guns (3×1); 4 × 40 mm guns (2×2); 9 × 20 mm guns (9×1); 1 × Hedgehog anti-submarine mortar; 8 × Y-gun depth charge projectors; 2 × depth charge tracks

USS Lorain (PF-93), a Tacoma-class frigate, was the first commissioned ship of the United States Navy to be named for Lorain, Ohio.

Lorain (PF-93) was authorized as Roanoke (PG-201) and laid down as Roanoke (PF-93) under a United States Maritime Commission contract by American Ship Building Company, Lorain, Ohio, 25 October 1943. She was renamed Lorain on 7 February 1944; launched on 18 March 1944, sponsored by Mrs. Fred Henderson; and commissioned at Baltimore, Maryland, on 15 January 1945.

== Service history ==
Lorain departed Baltimore on 28 January 1945 for Norfolk, Virginia, and Bermuda, where the Coast Guard-crewed frigate underwent shakedown and training. After further training in Casco Bay, Maine, she sailed on 11 April for NS Argentia, Newfoundland, her base for weather patrols through the following summer. Operating out of Argentia and later Reykjavík, Iceland, she ranged the North Atlantic from the coastal waters of Greenland to waters north of the Azores, reporting vital meteorological data.

Lorain returned to Boston on 14 September, conducted a weather patrol off New England in late October, then sailed on 2 December for duty in the Caribbean. An escort run took her to Recife, Brazil, early in 1946, and after two weather patrols east of Bermuda, she returned to Boston on 7 March, and decommissioned there on 14 March 1946.

She was sold on 26 March 1947 to the French Navy and commissioned on the same day as Laplace (F-13). Disarmed a year later, she served as weather observation ship in the North Atlantic until sunk by a leftover World War II mine on 16 September 1950.
