= USS Panda =

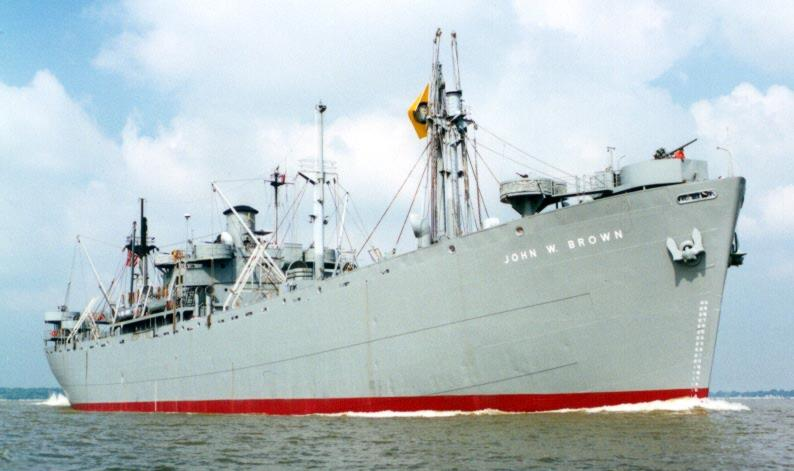
- Panda was a standard liberty ship, similar to SS John W. Brown, seen here.

History

United States
- Laid down: 1943
- Launched: 3 December 1943
- Commissioned: 6 January 1944
- Decommissioned: 12 July 1946
- Stricken: 31 July 1946
- Fate: Returned to the WSA

General characteristics
- Displacement: 3665 tons lightship, 14,245 full load
- Length: 441 ft 6 in (134.57 m)
- Beam: 57 ft (17 m)
- Draught: 27 ft 9 in (8.46 m)
- Speed: 11 knots
- Complement: 84 officers and men
- Armament: one 5-inch 38 caliber gun; one 3 in (76 mm) gun; eight 20 mm cannon

USS Panda (IX-125), an Armadillo-class tanker designated an unclassified miscellaneous vessel, was the only ship of the United States Navy to be named for the panda. Her keel was laid down as Opie Read (MC hull 1929) in 1943 by Delta Shipbuilding Company, in New Orleans, Louisiana (T. Z.ET1.S.C3). She was renamed Panda on 27 October 1943 upon charter from the War Shipping Administration, accepted 5 January 1944, and commissioned on 6 January 1944.

Panda joined the logistics forces of the Seventh Fleet in the Southwest Pacific in March 1944, and served as floating oil storage facility, primarily at Hollandia, New Guinea, until October, when she followed the invasion forces to San Pedro Bay, Leyte. During the next three months, her gunners shot down five enemy planes during four separate attacks, none of which put her out of action. Her service to the fleet in the Philippines continued through the final months of action. Panda remained in the Philippines to serve occupation forces until sailing for Norfolk, Virginia, arriving 5 June 1946. There she decommissioned on 12 July 1946, returned to the War Shipping Administration on 15 July 1946, and was stricken from the Naval Vessel Register on 31 July 1946.

Panda received one battle star for World War II service.
