= USS Milledgeville (PF-94) =

Tacoma-class frigate

History

United States
- Name: Sitka (1943–1944); Milledgeville (1944–1947)
- Namesake: City of Sitka, Alaska; City of Milledgeville, Georgia
- Builder: American Ship Building Company, Lorain, Ohio
- Laid down: 9 November 1943
- Launched: 5 April 1944
- Commissioned: 18 January 1945
- Decommissioned: 21 August 1946
- Renamed: Milledgevill, 7 February 1944
- Stricken: 23 April 1947
- Fate: Scrapped, 25 March 1948

General characteristics
- Class & type: Tacoma-class frigate
- Displacement: 1,264 long tons (1,284 t)
- Length: 303 ft 11 in (92.63 m)
- Beam: 37 ft 6 in (11.43 m)
- Draft: 13 ft 8 in (4.17 m)
- Propulsion: 2 × 5,500 shp (4,100 kW) turbines; 3 boilers; 2 shafts
- Speed: 20 knots (37 km/h; 23 mph)
- Complement: 190
- Armament: 3 × 3"/50 dual purpose guns (3x1); 4 x 40 mm guns (2×2); 9 × 20 mm guns (9×1); 1 × Hedgehog anti-submarine mortar; 8 × Y-gun depth charge projectors; 2 × Depth charge tracks

USS Milledgeville (PF-94), a Tacoma-class frigate, was the first ship of the United States Navy to be named for Milledgeville, Georgia.

== Construction ==
The first Milledgeville (PF-94), originally classified PG-202, was reclassified PF-94 on 15 April 1943; named Sitka on 11 October 1943; laid down under Maritime Commission contract by American Ship Building Company in Lorain, Ohio, on 9 November 1943; renamed Milledgeville on 7 February 1944; launched on 5 April 1944, sponsored by Mrs. Sara Allen Moore; and placed in service at New Orleans, Louisiana, on 16 November 1944. She steamed to Charleston, South Carolina, on 18 November; was placed out of service on 24 November; and underwent conversion to a weather station ship in the Charleston Navy Yard. Milledgeville was commissioned on 18 January 1945 at Charleston.

== Service history ==
Following shakedown and training off Bermuda, Milledgeville had duty with TF 24. Between 3 and 5 April, she sailed to Naval Station Argentia, Newfoundland, and on the 7th she departed on her initial weather patrol in the North Atlantic. Until returning to Argentia on 26 April, she operated on Weather Station No. 1 gathering meteorological information and maintaining air-sea rescue patrols.

Between 11 May and 25 August, Milledgeville carried out three more patrols in North Atlantic waters; after which she steamed to Boston, Massachusetts, for overhaul during September. She returned to Argentia on 7 October; completed her 5th North Atlantic patrol on 29 October; and arrived back at Boston on 5 November to prepare for weather station duty in the South Atlantic.

Departing Boston on 16 November, Milledgeville sailed via Trinidad to Recife, Brazil, where she arrived on 1 December. Between 19 and 31 December, she patrolled Weather Station No. 12 off Brazil, then sailed to Trinidad and to Argentia, arriving off Newfoundland on 20 January 1946. Milledgeville resumed North Atlantic patrol duty on 21 January, and during the next several months she continued patrols while operating out of Argentia and Boston.

She was decommissioned at Boston on 21 August 1946, and she was sold to Southern Scrap Material Company of New Orleans, Louisiana, on 9 April 1946. Her name was struck from the Navy list on 23 April 1947. She was scrapped starting on 25 March 1948.
