= Iota Cancri =

Double star in the constellation Cancer

ι Cancri
- Location of ι Cancri (circled)

Observation data Epoch J2000.0 Equinox ICRS
- Constellation: Cancer
- ι Cnc A
- Right ascension: 08^{h} 46^{m} 41.820^{s}
- Declination: +28° 45′ 35.62″
- Apparent magnitude (V): 4.03
- ι Cnc B
- Right ascension: 08^{h} 46^{m} 39.980^{s}
- Declination: +28° 45′ 54.21″
- Apparent magnitude (V): 6.58

Characteristics

ι Cnc A
- Spectral type: G8IIIa Ba0.2
- B−V color index: 1.007±0.015

ι Cnc B
- Evolutionary stage: main sequence
- Spectral type: A2V
- B−V color index: 0.051±0.008

Astrometry

ι Cnc A
Radial velocity (R_{v})	15.74±0.13 km/s
Proper motion (μ)	RA: −22.070 mas/yr Dec.: −43.699 mas/yr
Parallax (π)	9.4124±0.1621 mas
Distance	347 ± 6 ly (106 ± 2 pc)
Absolute magnitude (M_{V})	−0.79

ι Cnc B
Radial velocity (R_{v})	25.00±1.5 km/s
Proper motion (μ)	RA: −24.397 mas/yr Dec.: −44.250 mas/yr
Parallax (π)	9.6720±0.0362 mas
Distance	337 ± 1 ly (103.4 ± 0.4 pc)

Details

ι Cnc A
Mass	2.376±0.011 M_{☉}
Radius	21 R_{☉}
Luminosity	204 L_{☉}
Surface gravity (log g)	2.5 cgs
Temperature	4,954 K
Metallicity [Fe/H]	−0.14 dex

ι Cnc B
Mass	2.113±0.035 M_{☉}
Radius	1.94±0.05 R_{☉}
Luminosity	24.9±1.2 L_{☉}
Surface gravity (log g)	4.23±0.06 cgs
Temperature	9,259±139 K
Rotational velocity (v sin i)	170 km/s
Age	263 Myr

Other designations
- ι Cancri, 48 Cancri, WDS J08467+2846
- Iota Cancri A: Yuyu, NSV 4238, BD+29°1824, FK5 328, GC 12083, HD 74739, HIP 43103, HR 3475, SAO 80416
- Iota Cancri B: BD+29°1823, GC 12080, HD 74738, HIP 43100, HR 3474, SAO 80415, TIC 117355623

Database references
SIMBAD	A
- B

Iota Cancri, also named Yuyu, is a double star in the constellation Cancer. The brighter component is located at a distance of approximately 347 light-years (106 pc) from Earth based on parallax measurements, and is drifting further away with a line of sight velocity of 16 km/s.

The two stars of ι Cancri are separated by 30.5 arcseconds as of 2019, corresponding to a projected separation of 3,236 AU (0.05 ly). Although no orbit has been derived, the pair show a large common proper motion and are assumed to be gravitationally related.

== Nomenclature ==
ι Cancri (Latinised to Iota Cancri, abbreviated ι Cnc or Iota Cnc) is the star's Bayer designation.

In Bali (Indonesia), the constellation Cancer is called Yuyu. Yuyu is a word from Javanese that means freshwater crab, inherited from Old Javanese hayuyu, spoken on the island of Java. The animal can be found in rice fields in Indonesia and the constellation is attested for at least 1300 years. The IAU Working Group on Star Names approved the name Yuyu for Iota Cancri A on 22 February 2026.

ι Cancri together with α Cancri were known in Arabic as Al Zubanāh, the claws (of the crab), originating in translation of Ptolemy's Tetrabiblos. This is the source of the modern name Acubens for α Cancri; a 1971 NASA catalog of star names also used the name Zubanah for ι Cancri.

== Properties ==
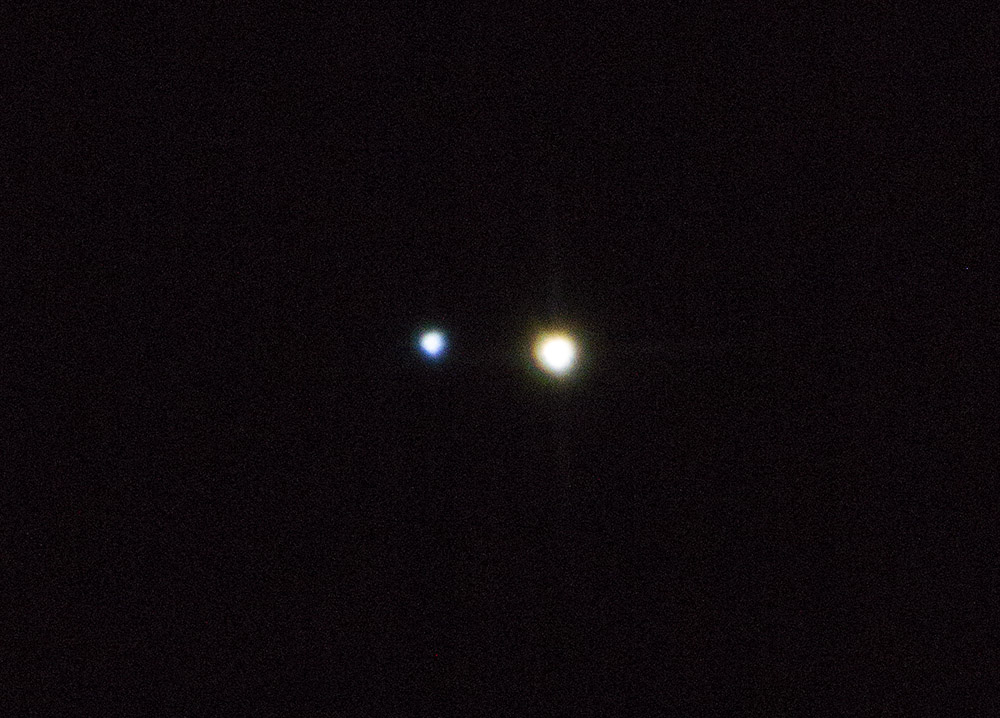
ι Cancri A (right) and B (Jeffrey Fisher)

The brighter star, ι Cancri A, is a yellow G-type giant with a stellar classification of G8IIIa Ba0.2 and an apparent visual magnitude of +4.03. The suffix notation 'Ba0.2' indicates this is a mild barium star, thought to be caused by mass transfer of enriched material from an asymptotic giant branch star onto a less evolved companion. No such donor has been detected in the ι Cancri system, but it is assumed that there is an unseen white dwarf.

This star has 2.4 times the mass of the Sun and has expanded to 21 times the Sun's radius. It is radiating 204 times the Sun's luminosity from its enlarged photosphere at an effective temperature of 4,954 K.

The fainter of the two stars, ι Cancri B, is a white A-type main-sequence star with a class of A2V and an apparent magnitude of +6.58. The star has 2.1 times the Sun's mass and 1.9 times the Sun's radius. It is radiating 25 times the luminosity of the Sun from its photosphere at an effective temperature of 9,259 K. With an estimated age of 263 million years, it is spinning rapidly with a projected rotational velocity of 170 km/s. This is a shell star, surrounded by material expelled by its rapid rotation.
