= SS Mahlon Pitney =

Liberty ship of WWII

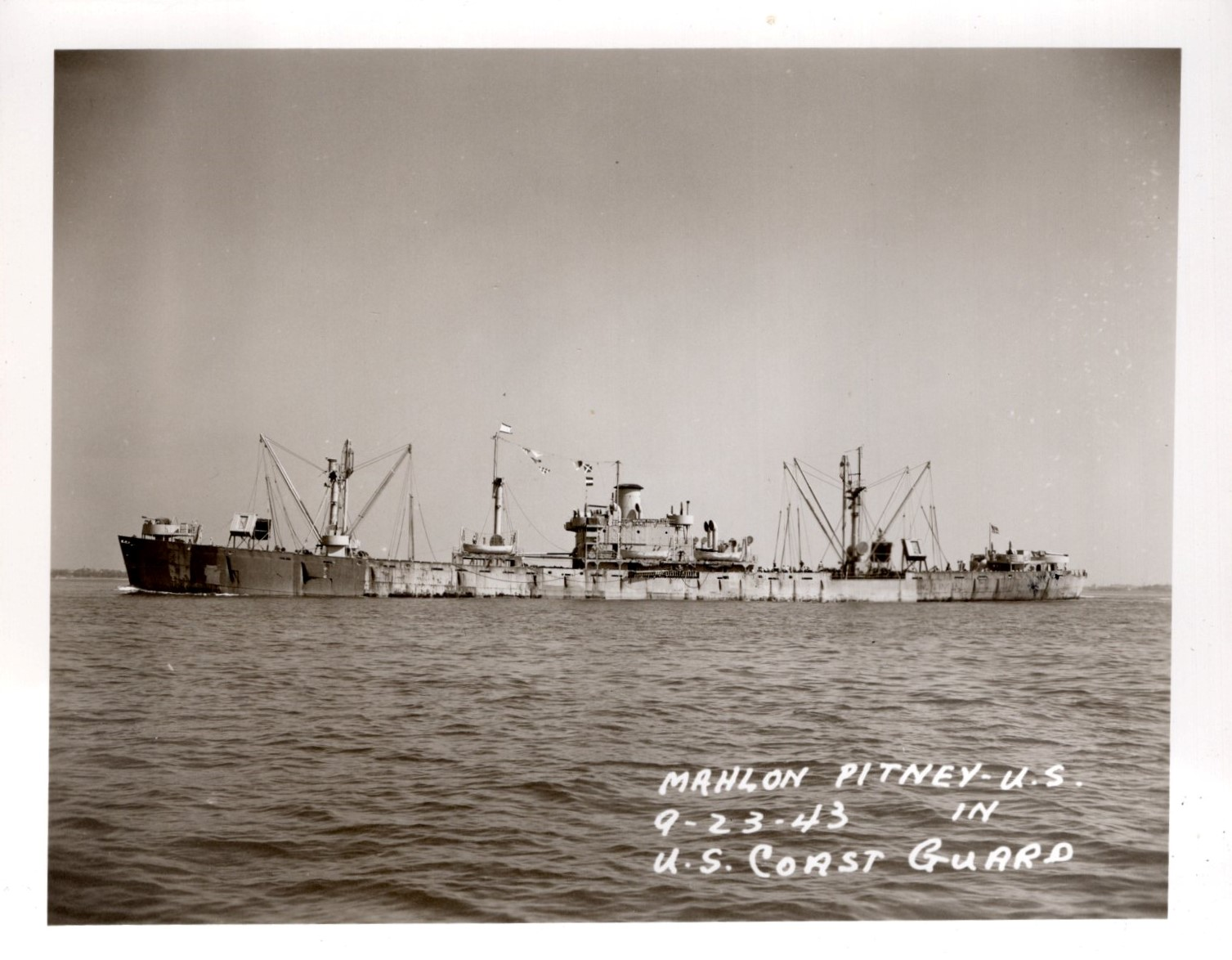
- Liberty ship Mahlon Pitney, 23 September 1943

History

United States
- Name: Mahlon Pitney
- Namesake: Mahlon Pitney
- Owner: War Shipping Administration (WSA)
- Operator: Grace Line, Inc.
- Ordered: as type (EC2-S-C1) hull, MCE hull 942
- Awarded: 30 January 1942
- Builder: Bethlehem-Fairfield Shipyard, Baltimore, Maryland
- Cost: $1,073,483
- Yard number: 2092
- Way number: 16
- Laid down: 31 December 1942
- Launched: 11 February 1943
- Completed: 26 February 1943
- Identification: Call sign: KKAV
- Fate: Laid up in Reserve Fleet, 29 October 1948, sold 16 November 1965

United States
- Owner: Zidell Explorations
- Renamed: Twin Harbors No.2
- Fate: Scrapped 2010
- Notes: Ship used in lighter service

General characteristics
- Class & type: Liberty ship; type EC2-S-C1, standard
- Tonnage: 10,865 LT DWT; 7,176 GRT
- Displacement: 3,380 long tons (3,434 t) (light); 14,245 long tons (14,474 t) (max)
- Length: 441 feet 6 inches (135 m) oa; 416 feet (127 m) pp; 427 feet (130 m) lwl
- Beam: 57 feet (17 m)
- Draft: 27 ft 9.25 in (8.4646 m)
- Installed power: 2 × Oil fired 450 °F (232 °C) boilers, operating at 220 psi (1,500 kPa); 2,500 hp (1,900 kW)
- Propulsion: 1 × triple-expansion steam engine, (manufactured by Worthington Pump & Machinery Corp, Harrison, New Jersey); 1 × screw propeller
- Speed: 11.5 knots (21.3 km/h; 13.2 mph)
- Capacity: 562,608 cubic feet (15,931 m^{3}) (grain); 499,573 cubic feet (14,146 m^{3}) (bale)
- Complement: 38–62 USMM; 21–40 USNAG
- Armament: Varied by ship; Bow-mounted 3-inch (76 mm)/50-caliber gun; Stern-mounted 4-inch (102 mm)/50-caliber gun; 2–8 × single 20-millimeter (0.79 in) Oerlikon anti-aircraft (AA) cannons and/or, 2–8 × 37-millimeter (1.46 in) M1 AA guns

SS Mahlon Pitney was a Liberty ship built in the United States during World War II. She was named after Mahlon Pitney, an American lawyer, jurist, and politician who served in the U.S. House of Representatives for two terms from 1895 to 1899. He later served as an associate justice of the U.S. Supreme Court from 1912 to 1922.

== Construction ==
Mahlon Pitney was laid down on 31 December 1942, under a Maritime Commission (MARCOM) contract, MCE hull 942, by the Bethlehem-Fairfield Shipyard, Baltimore, Maryland; she was launched on 11 February 1943.

== History ==
She was allocated to the Grace Line, Inc., on 26 February 1943.

On 29 October 1948, she was laid up in the Hudson River Reserve Fleet, in Hoboken, New Jersey. On 28 September 1948, she was laid up in the Astoria Reserve Fleet, in Astoria, Oregon. On 15 July 1954, she was withdrawn from the fleet to be loaded with grain under the "Grain Program 1954", she returned loaded with grain on 31 July 1954. She was withdrawn from the fleet on 7 January 1957, to have the grain unloaded, she returned empty on 15 January 1957. On 7 October 1965, she was sold for $54,000, to Zidell Explorations Inc., for non-transportation use, and renamed Twin Harbors No.2. On 16 November 1965, she was withdrawn from the fleet and put into barge service. In August 2010, she was scrapped, along with her sister ship SS Woodbridge N. Ferris, in Tacoma, Washington.

== Bibliography ==
- "Bethlehem-Fairfield, Baltimore MD". www.ShipbuildingHistory.com. 7 August 2021.
- Maritime Administration. "Mahlon Pitney". Ship History Database Vessel Status Card. U.S. Department of Transportation, Maritime Administration.
- Davies, James (May 2004). "Specifications (As-Built)" (PDF). p. 23.
- "SS Mahlon Pitney".
- Carson, Rob (4 August 2010). "World War II Liberty Ships Recycled in Tacoma". News Tribune.
