= Alpha Cancri =

Star system in the constellation Cancer

α Cancri
- α Cancri, circled, is the bottom left star in the "crab".

Observation data Epoch J2000 Equinox ICRS
- Constellation: Cancer
- Right ascension: 08^{h} 58^{m} 29.2042^{s}
- Declination: +11° 51′ 27.649″
- Apparent magnitude (V): 4.20 to 4.27

Characteristics
- Spectral type: kA7VmF0/2III/IVSr
- U−B color index: +0.15
- B−V color index: +0.14
- R−I color index: +0.04

Astrometry
Radial velocity (R_{v})	−12.1±0.8 km/s
Proper motion (μ)	RA: 42.181 mas/yr Dec.: −31.160 mas/yr
Parallax (π)	18.3304±0.3216 mas
Distance	178 ± 3 ly (54.6 ± 1.0 pc)
Absolute magnitude (M_{V})	0.46

Details

A
Mass	2.10 M_{☉}
Radius	3.655 R_{☉}
Luminosity	49 L_{☉}
Surface gravity (log g)	3.73 cgs
Temperature	7,943 K
Rotational velocity (v sin i)	75 km/s

B
Mass	0.38 M_{☉}
Radius	0.67 R_{☉}
Luminosity	0.13 L_{☉}
Surface gravity (log g)	4.61 cgs
Temperature	4,205 K

Other designations
- Acubens, Sertan, Sartan, α Cnc, Alpha Cancri, Alpha Cnc, 65 Cancri, 65 Cnc, BD+12 1948, FK5 337, GC 12406, HD 76756, HIP 44066, HR 3572, SAO 98267, PPM 125972, ADS 7115 A, CCDM J08585+1151A

Database references
SIMBAD	data
- B

Alpha Cancri is a star system in the northern constellation of Cancer. Its name is a Bayer designation that is Latinized from α Cancri, and abbreviated Alpha Cnc or α Cnc. The primary component has the proper name Acubens, pronounced /ˈækjuːbɛnz/. It forms a fourth-magnitude star with an apparent magnitude of 4.20, making it visible to the naked eye under good viewing conditions. Based on parallax measurements, it is located at a distance of 178 light-years (55 pc) from the Sun, but is drifting closer with a radial velocity of −12 km/s. Since it is near the ecliptic, it can be occulted by the Moon.

== Properties ==
The primary component, α Cancri A, has a stellar classification of kA7VmF0/2III/IVSr, indicating an Am star with calcium K-lines similar to an A7 main sequence star and hydrogen lines more like an F0 giant or subgiant star. It is a white A-type main-sequence star with an apparent magnitude of +4.26. The star has 2.10 times the mass of the Sun and 3.7 times the Sun's radius. It has a high rate of spin, showing a projected rotational velocity of 75 km/s. The star is radiating 49 times the luminosity of the Sun from its photosphere at an effective temperature of 7,943 K.

Its companion, α Cancri B, is an eleventh-magnitude star. In the year 1836, its position angle was observed at 325 degrees with a separation from the main star α Cancri A of 11.3 arcseconds. α Cancri A may itself be a close binary, consisting of two stars with similar brightness and a separation of 0.1 arcsecond, though this is questioned. Indeed, a light curve generated during a 2014 lunar occultation failed to demonstrate a close companion.

== Nomenclature ==
α Cancri (Latinised to Alpha Cancri) is the star's Bayer designation.

Johann Bode designated this star as α^{2} Cancri, as he also used the superscript α^{1} for the star 60 Cancri. Bode's superscripts are rarely used though, so the designations have reverted ever since.

The traditional name Acubens (Açubens) is derived from the Arabic الزبانى al zubanāh, 'the claws'. A second name, Sertan /ˈsɜːrtæn/, derives from the Arabic al-saraṭān, 'the crab'. These names were traditionally shared with ι Cancri, which marks the crab's other claw. The International Astronomical Union's Working Group on Star Names (WGSN) chose Acubens as the proper name for the primary component α Cancri A.

== In modern culture ==
USS Acubens (AKS-5) was a United States Navy ship.
