= USCGC Dependable =

United States Coast Guard ship

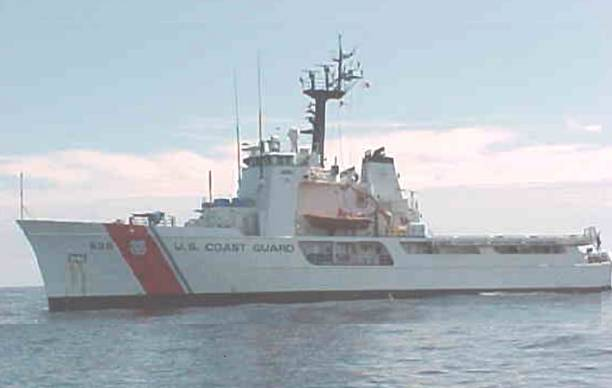
- USCGC Dependable (WMEC-626)

History

United States
- Builder: American Ship Building Company, Lorain, Ohio
- Laid down: July 17, 1967
- Launched: March 16, 1968
- Commissioned: November 22, 1968
- Out of service: April 9, 2024
- Home port: Virginia Beach, Virginia
- Identification: MMSI number: 367294000; Callsign: NOWK
- Motto: Pro Lege pro Patria Conamur and Count on Us
- Status: In commission, special status

General characteristics
- Displacement: 759 tons
- Length: 210 ft 6 in (64.16 m)
- Beam: 34 ft (10 m)
- Draught: 10 ft 6 in (3.20 m) max
- Propulsion: 2 x V16 2550 horsepower ALCO diesel engines
- Speed: max 18 knots; 2,700 mile range
- Range: cruise 14 knots; 6,100 mile range
- Complement: 12 officers, 63 enlisted
- Sensors & processing systems: 2 x AN/SPS-64
- Armament: 1 × Mk 38 25mm machine gun; 2 × M2HB .50 caliber machine gun
- Aircraft carried: HH-65 Dolphin

USCGC Dependable (WMEC–626) is a United States Coast Guard medium endurance cutter. Dependable was commissioned November 22, 1968. On April 9, 2024 Dependable was removed from active duty and placed in commission, special status. Her most recent homeport was Virginia Beach, Virginia.

== Construction ==
Dependable's keel was laid down by the American Ship Building Company, Lorain, Ohio on July 17, 1967 and she was launched March 16, 1968. She was designed for search-and-rescue work; at launch, she had a small, high superstructure with 360-degree visibility and a correspondingly large helicopter pad aft without a hanger. To improve the view from the bridge and to ease helicopter operations, her engine exhaust was not routed through a stack but out through the transom. In practice, waves washing into the exhaust openings in heavy weather proved troublesome. The exhaust through the transom was replaced by a conventional stack during Dependable's Mid-life Maintenance Availability in 1995. Afterwards the ship had a larger superstructure and a smaller helicopter pad. Her hull is welded steel and her superstructure aluminum, as is usual with contemporary warships.

At launch, Dependable's main armament was an open-mount Mark 22 3-inch/50 caliber gun on the foredeck. During the Mid-life Maintenance Availability this gun was replaced by a 25-mm/87 cal Bushmaster Mark 38. She is also armed with two M2HB .50 caliber machine guns. Her design included space and weight reservations for Hedgehog anti-submarine mortars and later Mark 32 anti-submarine torpedoes but these were never actually installed.

== History ==
=== Homeports ===
For 23 years after her commissioning Dependable was homeported in Panama City, Florida. In January 1992, the ship and her crew relocated to Galveston, Texas where she remained until she was decommissioned on February 24, 1995 for Major Maintenance Availability, an 18-month, 21.7 million dollar project at the United States Coast Guard Yard in Baltimore, Maryland, to overhaul and upgrade selected systems and equipment. The Coast Guard anticipated another fifteen years of service due to these renovations. Dependable was re-commissioned on August 15, 1997 and her homeport became Portsmouth, Virginia for three years, changing to Cape May, New Jersey, on August 4, 2000. In 2005, Dependable received a lengthy Mission Effectiveness Project upgrade to extend her working life. On May 30, 2015, her homeport was shifted to Joint Expeditionary Base Little Creek-Fort Story in Virginia Beach, Virginia where it remained until she left active service. Examples of Dependable's missions throughout her working life include enforcing fishery regulations in the Atlantic, interdicting drug traffickers in the Caribbean, and rescuing Cuban and Haitian migrants in the Florida Straits.

=== Notable law enforcement activities ===
In 1978, Dependable's third year of conducting law enforcement patrols, the crew intercepted and interdicted 15% of the marijuana seized by the entire Coast Guard. The largest seizure of 1978 was on August 7 when she seized the merchant vessel Heidi, which was carrying over 240,000 lb (110,000 kg) of marijuana. On August 23, 1981 she reached a career milestone of having seized one million pounds of marijuana when she seized the fishing vessel Sea King, carrying nine tons of marijuana. With this achievement she earned the right to paint a golden marijuana leaf outside her bridge. In February 2000, she participated in a joint effort with a Coast Guard Law Enforcement Detachment. After the detachment seized fishing vessel Rebelde, she towed the vessel from Cristobal, Panama and transported six tons of cocaine and seven smugglers to Tampa, Florida, for prosecution. The journey lasted several days and covered 1,250 nautical miles (2,320 km). In 2013, Dependable made the biggest drug interception (street value approximately US$20 million) in the history of the Coast Guard First District, whose responsibility is the Atlantic Ocean off the coast of the northeastern United States.

=== Notable rescue activities ===
Dependable earned the Humanitarian Service Award for her lifesaving work in the 1980 Mariel boatlift. She was the first major cutter on the scene and carried out 32 search-and-rescue cases. She was one of the first cutters to respond to the January 2010 Haiti earthquake, where she earned the Armed Services Medal. She also participated in the response to Hurricane Florence in 2018. At the very end of her active service, during a December 2023-February 2024 patrol supporting Operation Vigilant Sentry, Dependable searched for and found a 25-foot vessel in distress off the coast of Haiti. Working in 8- to 12-foot seas and winds gusting to 46 mph, Dependable's crew rescued all 33 people aboard the distressed vessel.

=== Awards ===
The Dependable has received several awards including three Coast Guard Unit Commendations. She also has received two Coast Guard Meritorious Unit Commendations and the Humanitarian Service Medal.

=== Deactivation ===
On April 9, 2024 Dependable was removed from active duty and placed in commission, special status. Her crew departed to other duty stations to help address the Coast Guard's shortage of enlisted personnel. At that time, how long Dependable would remain in this inactive shipyard status was unknown, nor was it known whether she would be reactivated or decommissioned.
