= 45 Cancri =

Star in the constellation Cancer

Observation data Epoch J2000.0 Equinox ICRS
- Constellation: Cancer
- Right ascension: 08^{h} 43^{m} 12.32940^{s}
- Declination: +12° 40′ 51.1486″
- Apparent magnitude (V): 5.62

Characteristics
- Spectral type: G8 III and A3 III
- B−V color index: 0.435±0.005

Astrometry
Radial velocity (R_{v})	−6.2±2.3 km/s
Proper motion (μ)	RA: −9.828 mas/yr Dec.: +0.916 mas/yr
Parallax (π)	4.7700±0.1025 mas
Distance	680 ± 10 ly (210 ± 5 pc)
Absolute magnitude (M_{V})	−1.62

Orbit
Period (P)	1,009.36±0.12 d
Eccentricity (e)	0.461±0.002
Semi-amplitude (K_{1}) (primary)	20.04±0.06 km/s
Semi-amplitude (K_{2}) (secondary)	20.75±0.02 km/s

Details

45 Cnc A
Mass	3.11±0.10 M_{☉}
Radius	13.86+5.03 −1.73 R_{☉}
Luminosity	210.3±5.4 L_{☉}
Surface gravity (log g)	2.72 cgs
Temperature	5,058 K
Metallicity [Fe/H]	−0.69±0.22 dex
Rotational velocity (v sin i)	5.3 km/s

45 Cnc B
Mass	3.00±0.10 M_{☉}
Luminosity	190.5+43.9 −35.6 L_{☉}

Other designations
- A^{1} Cnc,, 45 Cnc, BD+13°1972, FK5 2686, HD 74228, HIP 42795, HR 3450, SAO 98069

Database references
SIMBAD	data

45 Cancri is a binary star system in the zodiac constellation of Cancer, located 680 light-years away from the Sun. It has the Bayer designation A^{1} Cancri; 45 Cancri is the Flamsteed designation. It is visible to the naked eye as a faint, white-hued star at an apparent visual magnitude of 5.62. The pair form a double-lined spectroscopic binary with an orbital period of 2.76 years and an eccentricity of 0.46. They are drifting closer to the Earth with a heliocentric radial velocity of −6 km/s.

The primary, designated component A, is an aging giant star with a stellar classification of G8 III, but has most likely not yet made multiple ascents up the red giant branch. It has 3.11 times the mass of the Sun and has expanded to 14 times the Sun's radius. The star is radiating 210 times the luminosity of the Sun from its enlarged photosphere at an effective temperature of 5,058 K. The less evolved secondary, component B is likewise a giant star, having a class of A3 III. It has three times the mass of the Sun and shines with 191 times the Sun's luminosity.
