= Hecuba (statue) =

Statue on the USC campus

Coordinates: 34°01′30″N 118°17′05″W

The Hecuba statue is a bronze sculpture located in the central piaza of USC Village at the University of Southern California. The statue honors Hecuba, the queen of Troy who was married to King Priam during the Trojan War. Designed to serve as a female counterpart to the iconic Tommy Trojan statue, the Hecuba statue symbolizes gender equality at USC and represents the diverse community of USC students, faculty, and alumni.

== History ==
The statue was designed by Christopher Slatoff, who also created the statue of judge Robert Maclay Widney, the university's founder, that stands in front of the Widney Alumni House on the south side of campus. The statue was unveiled on August 17, 2017, as the centerpiece of USC Village, a $700 million Gothic Revival-style mixed-use expansion of the USC campus.

== Features and symbolism ==
The Hecuba statue stands 12 feet tall, rising atop a pedestal that measures 9 feet tall, Hecuba is depicted extending her arm in an appeal to the USC community. The entire silica bronze sculpture weighs nearly two tons. The statue's base features six female figures, each representing a different academic discipline and embodying the ethnic diversity of USC. They are joined by a "ribbon of thought," signifying the interconnectedness of ideas and the continuous pursuit of learning. The base features two quotations from literature about Hecuba that are inscribed on the pedestal; a quotation from Hamlet and a pair of lines from Euripides' Hecuba. The two excerpts from Euripides appear in Greek. Notably, the quotation from Hamlet is attributed to "Shakespear's Hamlet", which the university said was intentional to give the statue a more "ancient feel".
