= 60 Cancri =

Orange-hued giant star in the constellation Cancer

- Location of 60 Cancri (circled in red)

Observation data Epoch J2000.0 Equinox ICRS
- Constellation: Cancer
- Right ascension: 08^{h} 55^{m} 55.54693^{s}
- Declination: +11° 37′ 33.6990″
- Apparent magnitude (V): +5.44

Characteristics
- Evolutionary stage: giant
- Spectral type: K5 III
- B−V color index: 1.462±0.004

Astrometry
Radial velocity (R_{v})	+25.38±0.16 km/s
Proper motion (μ)	RA: −15.443 mas/yr Dec.: −13.539 mas/yr
Parallax (π)	3.8596±0.1340 mas
Distance	850 ± 30 ly (259 ± 9 pc)

Details
Mass	1.42±0.45 M_{☉}
Radius	63 R_{☉}
Luminosity	1,023 L_{☉}
Surface gravity (log g)	1.28±0.11 cgs
Temperature	4,150±92 K
Metallicity [Fe/H]	−0.01±0.05 dex
Rotational velocity (v sin i)	8.75 km/s
Age	1.15+0.67 −0.43 Gyr

Other designations
- 60 Cnc, NSV 4308, BD+12°1941, GC 12339, HD 76351, HIP 43851, HR 3550, SAO 98235

Database references
SIMBAD	data

60 Cancri is a star in the zodiac constellation Cancer, located about 850 light-years away from the Sun. It is visible to the naked eye as a faint, orange-hued star with an apparent visual magnitude of +5.44. 60 Cancri is situated near the ecliptic, so it is subject to the occasional occultation by the Moon. It is moving away from the Earth with a heliocentric radial velocity of +25 km/s.

This is an aging giant star with a stellar classification of K5 III, indicating it has exhausted the hydrogen at its core and evolved off the main sequence. It is a suspected variable star of unknown type. The interferometry-measured angular diameter of the primary component, after correcting for limb darkening, is 1.94±0.02 mas, which, at its estimated distance, equates to a physical radius of about 54 times the radius of the Sun. It is around 1.15 billion years old with 1.4 times the mass of the Sun. The star is radiating just over a thousand times the Sun's luminosity from its enlarged photosphere at an effective temperature of 4,150 K.
