= USS Seer =

Minesweeper of the United States Navy

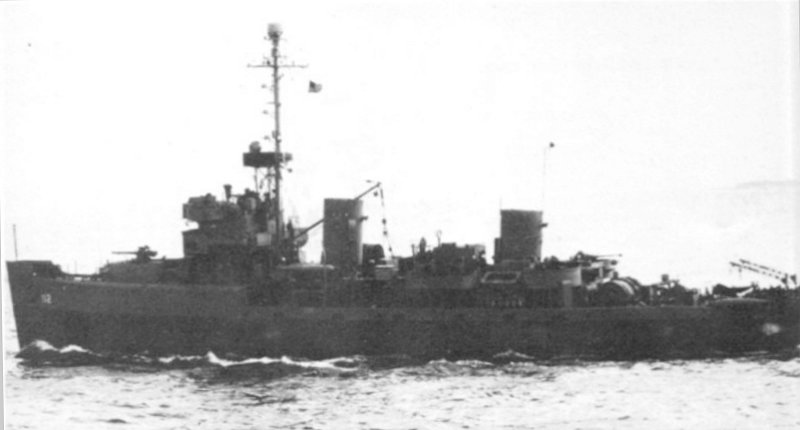

History

United States
- Name: USS Seer
- Builder: American Ship Building Company, Lorain, Ohio
- Laid down: 28 November 1941
- Launched: 23 May 1942
- Commissioned: 21 October 1942
- Decommissioned: 26 April 1947
- Recommissioned: 8 November 1950
- Reclassified: MSF-112, 7 February 1955
- Decommissioned: 11 March 1955
- Reclassified: MMC-5, 31 October 1958
- Stricken: 1 March 1963
- Honours and awards: 6 battle stars (World War II)
- Fate: Sold to Norway, 15 December 1962

History

Norway
- Name: HNoMS Uller (N50)
- Acquired: 15 December 1962
- Fate: Sunk as a target by the Royal Swedish Navy

General characteristics
- Class & type: Auk-class minesweeper
- Displacement: 890 long tons (904 t)
- Length: 221 ft 2 in (67.41 m)
- Beam: 32 ft (9.8 m)
- Draft: 11 ft (3.4 m)
- Propulsion: 2 × General Motors 12-278 diesel electric engines, 3,532 shp (2,634 kW) each; Farrel-Birmingham single reduction gear; 2 shafts
- Speed: 18 knots (33 km/h; 21 mph)
- Complement: 105 officers and enlisted
- Armament: 1 × 3"/50 caliber gun; 2 × 40 mm guns; 6 × 20 mm guns; 2 × Depth charge tracks; 4 × depth charge projectors; 1 × Hedgehog anti-submarine mortar

USS Seer (AM-112/MSF-112/MMC-5) was an Auk-class minesweeper of the United States Navy that served during World War II and the Korean War, and was sold to Norway in 1962.

Seer was laid down on 28 November 1941 by the American Ship Building Company of Lorain, Ohio. Launched on 23 May 1942, sponsored by Mrs. J.P. Conley, and commissioned on 21 October 1942.

== Service history ==
=== US East Coast, 1942–1943 ===
Following commissioning, Seer proceeded from the Great Lakes to Chesapeake Bay for shakedown; then commenced minesweeping, anti-submarine patrol, and coastal escort work in the 5th Naval District. In April 1943, her division, Mine Division (MinDiv) 16, joined Task Force 68 at Tompkinsville, New York; whence, on the 5th, she got underway to escort a convoy to North Africa.

=== Invasion of Sicily and Italy, 1943 ===
By the end of the month, the convoy had reached Gibraltar. During May and June as the forces scheduled to participate in Operation "Husky" — the invasion of Sicily — gathered in Algerian and Tunisian harbors — Seer, now a unit of the 8th Amphibious Force's Escort-Sweeper group, escorted ships to Bizerte, Oran, Ghazaouet, and Sousse; and patrolled off these ports. On 6 July, she joined the "Joss" attack force; and, on the 9th, she departed for Sicily. The next morning, she arrived off Licata; and, as the 3rd Infantry Division went ashore, she patrolled on a line four miles off "Red Beach". On the 11th, she was en route back to Bizerte to join another landing craft convoy and escort it to southern Sicily.

By the end of the month, she had brought up another convoy, and Palermo had fallen. In August, she began escorting ships to that port. As the ships offloaded, she added her armament to that protecting the harbor and covering the push to Messina. By mid-month, she had completed a second Bizerte-Palermo run; and, on the 17th, as Messina fell, she was caught in an air raid and took a small shell or small fragmentation bomb near the after 3-inch gun. Eight of her crew were injured; but, by the 19th, she was back at Palermo, whence she proceeded to Licata, Bizerte, and then to Mers El Kébir to prepare for the invasion of the Italian mainland at Salerno.

A unit of Task Force 81, she entered Salerno Bay on 8 September and commenced sweeping the transport area. Through the 11th, she continued sweeping despite interruptions during dive bombing attacks; then, until the 16th, she performed patrol duties.

For the next 10 days, she alternated Sicily-to-Salerno convoy duty with patrol work; and, on the 26th, she cleared the area to return to North Africa. Repairs alongside Delta (AR-9) followed; and, in mid-October, she resumed escort work with runs to Naples.

=== Invasion of Southern France, 1944 ===
Seer continued to escort merchant ship and amphibious convoys to Italy into the summer of 1944 when she joined the forces assigned to Operation "Dragoon," the landings in southern France. Departing Naples on 12 August, she moved toward the French coast; and, during the pre-dawn hours of the 15th, commenced sweeping the boat lanes leading to "Red Beach" on the Baie de Cavalaire. Further sweeping operations in the assault area and off Toulon and Marseille followed; and, for almost a month, she escaped damage from German mines and coastal guns. On 10 September, however, she struck a moored contact mine in the Rade d'Hyères. Three were killed, 20 injured. Hull and engine damage was severe.

Emergency repairs were performed at Toulon by the Royal Navy repair ship HM LSE-2; and, on 20 September, she was taken in tow by fleet tug Arikara (ATF-98) for Palermo. Further temporary repairs were completed there on 9 November, when she started back to the United States.

=== Return to the United States ===
Sailing via Bizerte and Oran, Seer arrived at Yorktown, Virginia, on 11 December and began repairs at the Norfolk Navy Yard on the 14th. By mid-March 1945, the work was completed, and the minesweeper conducted a series of tests off the Virginia coast for the Naval Ordnance Laboratory. During April, she operated off southern Florida.

=== Pacific Fleet, 1945–1947 ===
In early May, she transited the Panama Canal en route to Pearl Harbor where she rejoined her division, now assigned to the Pacific Fleet. Flagship of the division, Seer remained in Hawaiian waters until after the end of the war. On 17 August, she headed west to participate in postwar minesweeping operations off Japan, Formosa, and the China coast. On 15 January 1946, she departed Sasebo for the United States and inactivation. She arrived at San Pedro on 14 February; remained on the west coast into November; then got underway for Orange, Texas, where she was decommissioned on 26 April 1947 and berthed with the Atlantic Reserve Fleet.

=== Korean War, 1950–1955 ===
After the outbreak of the Korean War, Seer was ordered reactivated. Recommissioned on 8 November 1950, she joined MinDiv 8 and for the remainder of the war performed training and schoolship duties out of Charleston, South Carolina, conducting periodic tours at Mayport and Panama City, Florida. In January 1954, she returned to the Mediterranean for a four-month tour with the 6th Fleet. At the end of May, she returned to Charleston to resume operations from that port and from Panama City. On 6 January 1955, however, she departed Charleston to return to the inactive fleet.

=== Decommissioning and sale ===
Reclassified MSF-112 on 7 February 1955, four days later she was decommissioned and berthed at Green Cove Springs, Florida. The ship was reclassified as a Coastal Minelayer, MMC-5, on 31 October 1958.

The conversion to a coastal minelayer began in Norway in September 1960, and was completed in September 1962. The ship was transferred to the Royal Norwegian Navy on 15 December 1962 and renamed KNM Uller (N 50). Seer was struck from the Naval Vessel Register on 1 March 1963.

Seer earned six battle stars during World War II.
