= 50 Cancri =

Star in the constellation Cancer

Observation data Epoch J2000.0 Equinox J2000.0
- Constellation: Cancer
- Right ascension: 08^{h} 46^{m} 56.01919^{s}
- Declination: +12° 06′ 35.8305″
- Apparent magnitude (V): 5.89

Characteristics
- Evolutionary stage: main sequence
- Spectral type: A1 Vp
- B−V color index: 0.120±0.005
- Variable type: None

Astrometry
Radial velocity (R_{v})	23.3±2.9 km/s
Proper motion (μ)	RA: −63.773 mas/yr Dec.: −50.694 mas/yr
Parallax (π)	17.7961±0.0792 mas
Distance	183.3 ± 0.8 ly (56.2 ± 0.3 pc)
Absolute magnitude (M_{V})	+1.82±0.01

Details
Mass	2.1 M_{☉}
Luminosity	10.8±0.21 L_{☉}
Surface gravity (log g)	4.40 cgs
Temperature	8,340±48 K
Rotational velocity (v sin i)	18 km/s
Age	264 Myr

Other designations
- A^{2} Cancri, 50 Cnc, BD+12°1904, HD 74873, HIP 43121, HR 3481, SAO 98117

Database references
SIMBAD	data

50 Cancri is a single star in the zodiac constellation of Cancer, located 183 light years away from the Sun. It has the Bayer designation A^{2} Cancri; 50 Cancri is the Flamsteed designation. It is faintly visible to the naked eye as a white-hued star with an apparent visual magnitude of 5.89. The star is moving away from the Earth with a heliocentric radial velocity of 23 km/s, having come to within 118 light-years some 1.2 million years ago.

This is a chemically peculiar A-type main-sequence star with a stellar classification of A1 Vp. It is a Lambda Boötis star displaying strongly-depleted iron peak and alpha process elements, but otherwise relatively normal solar abundances. The star shows no variability down to a detection limit of 1.6 millimagnitudes. It is 264 million years old with a relatively low projected rotational velocity of 18 km/s. 50 Cancri has 2.1 times the mass of the Sun and is radiating 11 times the Sun's luminosity from its photosphere at an effective temperature of 8,340 K.

50 Cancri has an infrared excess, which most likely indicates a debris disk in orbit around the host star. A blackbody model of the emission shows a two component fit, with the warm section having a temperature of 246±91 K at a radius of 4±3 AU from the star, and a cool component at 108±21 K with a separation of 22±8 AU.
