= American Ship Building Company =

Shipbuilder company in North America

- Industry: Shipbuilding
- Predecessor: Cleveland Ship Building Company; Ship Owner's Dry Dock Company; Globe Iron Works; others
- Founded: 1899 (incorporated)
- Defunct: 1995
- Fate: Chapter 11 bankruptcy; assets sold and operations ceased (1995)
- Headquarters: Cleveland, Ohio (later Tampa, Florida), United States
- Area served: Great Lakes; United States Navy contracts
- Key people: George Steinbrenner (chairman & CEO), 1967–1995)
- Products: Great Lakes freighters; passenger vessels; United States Navy vessels
- Divisions: Lorain Yard (Ohio); Cleveland Yard; Toledo Shipbuilding; Chicago Shipbuilding; Detroit Shipbuilding; Buffalo Dry Dock; Superior Shipbuilding
- Subsidiaries: Tampa Shipyards, Inc.

The American Ship Building Company was the dominant shipbuilder on the Great Lakes before the Second World War. It started as Cleveland Shipbuilding in Cleveland, Ohio, in 1888 and opened the yard in Lorain, Ohio, in 1898. It changed its name to the American Ship Building Company in 1900, when it acquired Superior Shipbuilding, in Superior, Wisconsin; Toledo Shipbuilding, in Toledo, Ohio; and West Bay Shipbuilding, in West Bay City, Michigan. With the coming of World War I, the company also acquired Buffalo Dry Dock, in Buffalo, New York; Chicago Shipbuilding, in Chicago, Illinois; and Detroit Shipbuilding, in Wyandotte, Michigan. American Shipbuilding ranked 81st among United States corporations in the value of World War II military production contracts.

== The Lorain Yard ==
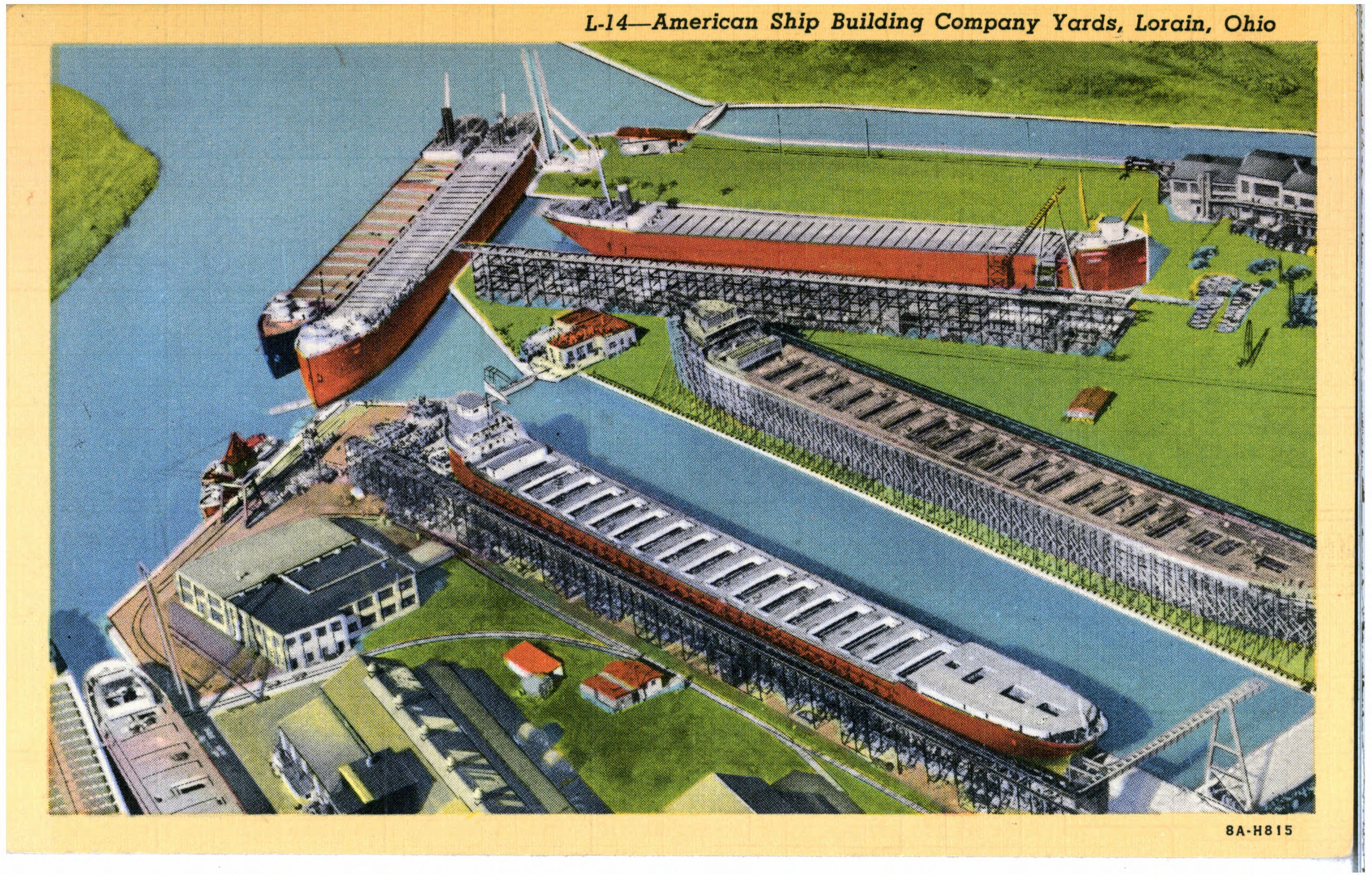
Circa 1938 postcard of the company's yard in Lorain, Ohio

The Lorain, Ohio, Yard served as the main facility of the company after World War II and to this day five of the 13 separate 1,000 ft (300 m) ore carriers on the Great Lakes were built in Lorain, including the MV Paul R. Tregurtha (originally named the MV William J. Delancey) which is the largest vessel on the Great Lakes (1,013'06" long). Built in 1898, the Lorain Yard quickly grew in size and importance. The facilities eventually included two dry docks over 1,000 feet (300 m) long built to handle the largest of the Great Lakes ore carriers. The Lorain Yard closed in 1983 after a series of labor disputes. Most of the buildings associated with shipyard were demolished with only the water tower and Ship Building Pattern Warehouse remaining. The pattern warehouse became The Shipyards dining and events venue, and then since 2024 has been home to the Lorain Brewing Company. The remaining lands are now being redeveloped as HarborWalk Residential Community, an upscale housing development.

== Ships built by the company ==
- SS Andaste, launched in 1892 in Cleveland, Ohio
- SS Clifton, launched in 1892 as a lake freighter, originally as the SS Samuel Mather.
- USRC Gresham, launched in 1896 in Cleveland.
- USRC Onondaga, launched in 1897 in Cleveland.
- SS Milwaukee, launched in 1902, in Cleveland originally as the Manistique-Marquette & Northern No. 1.
- SS Isaac M. Scott, built in 1909 in Lorain, Ohio, sunk in the Great Lakes Storm of 1913.
- SS Charles S. Price, launched in 1910 in Lorain, Ohio, sunk in the Great Lakes Storm of 1913.
- SS Henry B. Smith, built in 1906 for the Acme Transit Company, later sunk in the Great Lakes Storm of 1913.
- SS Anna C. Minch, built in 1903 in Cleveland.
- SS Milwaukee Clipper, built in 1904 in Cleveland, originally as the Juniata, for the Anchor Line.
- USS Wolverine (IX-64), originally built in 1913 as the Seeandbee in Lorain.
- SS Valley Camp, originally built in 1917 as Louis W. Hill in Lorain.
- USS Sable (IX-81), originally built in 1924 as the Greater Buffalo in Lorain.
- SS Robert Hobson, launched in 1927 in Lorain, later Outarde, broken up at Port Colborne 1985.
- USS Annapolis (PF-15), launched in 1943 in Lorain.
- SS American Valor, originally built as Armco for Oglebay Norton, sold to American Steamship Company in 2006, sold to Lower Lakes Towing in 2018. Built in 1952 in Lorain. Currently in long-term lay-up in Toledo, Ohio, renamed Valo.
- SS American Fortitude, originally built as Ernest T. Weir, sold to Oglebay Norton in 1978, renamed Courtney Burton.
- SS Arthur M. Anderson, built in 1952 in Lorain. Currently in long-term lay-up in Toledo, Ohio.
- SS Carl D. Bradley, built in 1927 in Lorain. Sank during a storm in 1958.
- SS Cason J. Callaway, built in 1952 in Lorain, currently in long-term lay-up in Escanaba, Michigan.
- SS Phillip R. Clarke, first of eight AAA-Class freighters, built in 1952 in Lorain. Currently in long-term lay-up in Toledo, Ohio.
- USS Seer (AM-112), launched in 1942 in Lorain.
- USS Key West (PF-17), launched in 1943 in Lorain.
- USS Alexandria (PF-18), launched in 1943 in Lorain.
- USS Huron (PF-19), launched in 1943 in Cleveland.
- USS Gulfport (PF-20), launched in 1943 in Cleveland.
- USS Lorain (PF-93), launched in 1944 in Lorain.
- USS Milledgeville (PF-94), launched in 1944 in Lorain.
- USS Orlando (PF-99), launched in 1943, Cleveland.
- USS Racine (PF-100), launched in 1943, Cleveland.
- USS Waxwing (AM-389), launched in 1945 in Lorain.
- USS YF-415, launched in 1943, Buffalo.
- USCGC Valiant (WMEC-621), launched in 1967 in Lorain.
- USCGC Courageous (WMEC-622), launched in 1967 in Lorain.
- USCGC Steadfast (WMEC-623), launched in 1967 in Lorain.
- USCGC Dauntless (WMEC-624), launched in 1967 in Lorain.
- USCGC Venturous (WMEC-625), launched in 1968 in Lorain.
- USCGC Dependable (WMEC-626), launched in 1968 in Lorain.
- USCGC Vigorous (WMEC-627), launched in 1968 in Lorain
- MV Calumet, built as William R. Roesch, sold to Oglebay Norton in 1994, renamed David Z. Norton. Sold Lower Lakes Towing in 2006, renamed to Calumet in 2008. Sister ship to MV Manitowoc and MV Robert S. Pierson. Built in 1973 in Lorain.
- MV Manitowoc, built as Paul Thayer, sold to Oglebay Norton in 1994, renamed Earl W. Oglebay. Sold Lower Lakes Towing in 2006, renamed to Manitowoc in 2008. Built in 1973 in Lorain. Sister ship to MV Calumet and MV Robert S. Pierson.
- MV Robert S. Pierson, built as the Wolverine for Oglebay Norton, sold to Lower Lakes Towing in 2008. Sister ship to MV Calumet and MV Manitowoc. Built in 1973 in Lorain.
- USNS Paul Buck (T-AOT-1122), launched in 1985, Tampa Shipyards (subsidiary of The American Ship Building Company)
- MV Roger Blough, built in Lorain in 1972. Currently in long-term lay-up in Conneaut, Ohio.
- MV Kaye E. Barker, originally SS Edward B. Greene, built in Lorain in 1952.
- MV James R. Barker, built in Lorain in 1976.
- MV Mesabi Miner, built in Lorain in 1977.
- MV Paul R. Tregurtha, originally MV William J. De Lancey, built in Lorain in 1981.
- Northern Wave built in 1889.

== Delta Shipbuilding Company ==
During the Second World War, the company managed the Delta Shipbuilding Company for the United States Maritime Commission. Delta had a shipyard in New Orleans and built a total of 188 ships. Delta Shipbuilding Company built 187 Liberty ships; the first completed was the SS William C.C. Claiborne, named after the first governor of Louisiana, William C. C. Claiborne.

The United States Maritime Commission had Delta and eight other emergency shipyards start building Liberty ships in 1941; 2,710 were produced during the war. Many were built in less than two months. The Delta shipyard was started specifically for the war effort, at a site on the Industrial Canal near the Almonaster Avenue Bridge, immediately south of the present-day I-10 high-rise bridge. The yard was shut down after the end of World War II.

Sample of ships built:

- SS Martin Behrman
- SS Josiah Parker
- SS Timothy Bloodworth
- USS Hesperia (AKS-13)
- SS Charles Henderson
- SS Benjamin Contee
- USS Panda (IX-125)
- USS Gratia (AKS-11)
- USS Cybele (AKS-10)
- USS Kochab (AKS-6)
- USS Porcupine (IX-126)
- USS Basilan
- SS James Eagan Layne
- USS Burias (AG-69)
- USS Wildcat (AW-2)
- USS Stag (AW-1)
- USS Hecuba (AKS-12)

== Toledo Shipbuilding Company ==
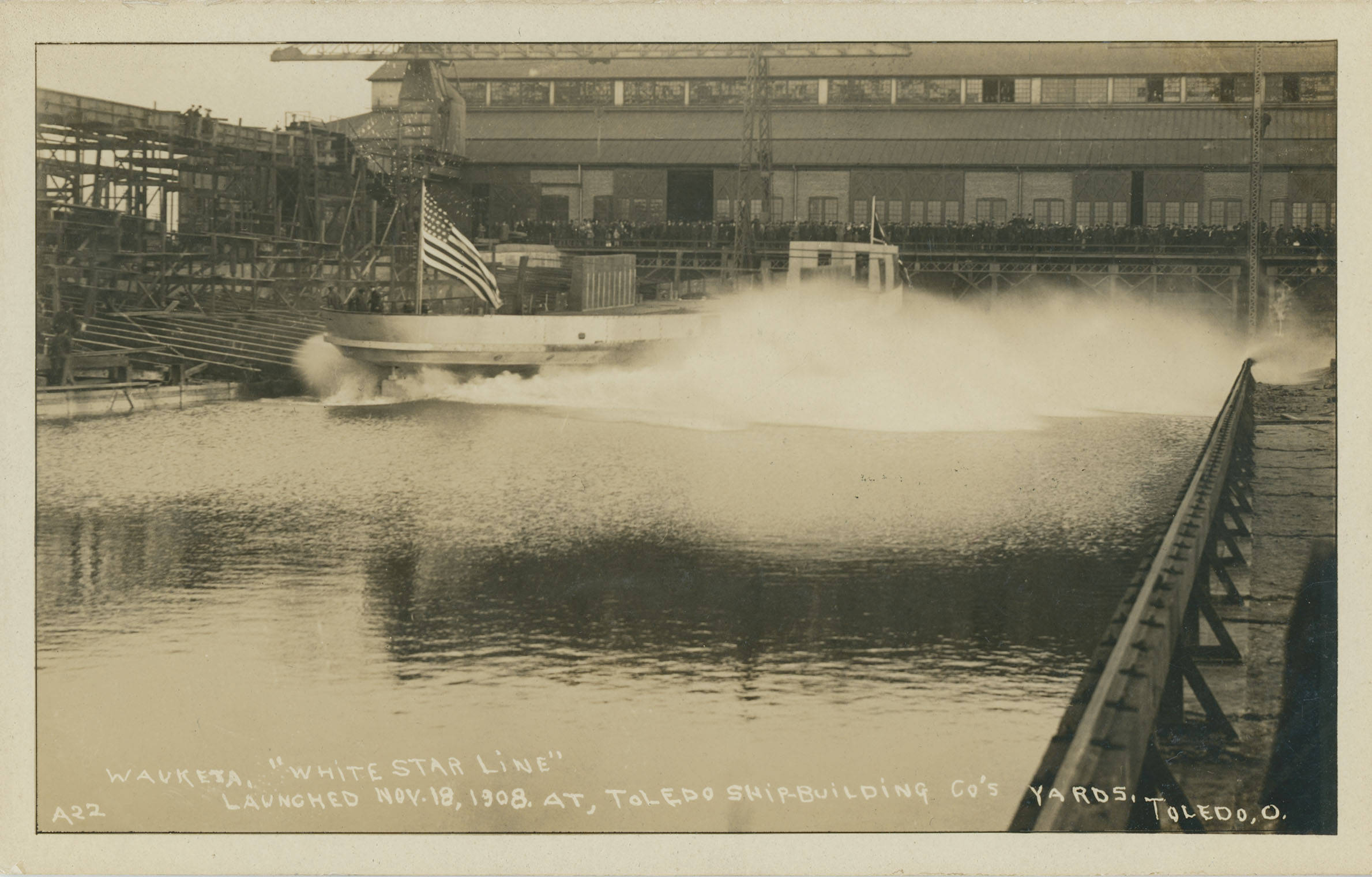
Wauketa, "White Star Line," Launched at Toledo Ship Building Company's Yards, Toledo, Ohio, 1908

The Toledo Shipbuilding Company, which became an operating unit of the American Shipbuilding Company by consolidation in 1945, was itself the builder of several of the most well-known coal-fired steamships of the Great Lakes, such as the SS Chief Wawatam (built in 1911).

== Steinbrenners ==
In the early 1960s, the American Ship Building Company acquired Kinsman Marine Transit Company, which was owned by the Steinbrenner family. As a result of the transaction, the Steinbrenner family acquired a controlling interest in American Ship Building. Frustrated after years of fighting with unions over cost-saving work changes, the Steinbrenners closed the Lorain shipyard in December 1983 and moved all operations to Tampa, Florida. The principal member of the Steinbrenner family who was involved in the operation of the company at this time was George Steinbrenner, who by then already was becoming better known as the principal owner of the New York Yankees.

The company began having difficulties in the 1980s, going through a bankruptcy in 1993. The company was sold in 1995.

== See also ==
- Pendleton Shipyard Company
- Type L6 ship
