= Northern Wave =

1800s steamship

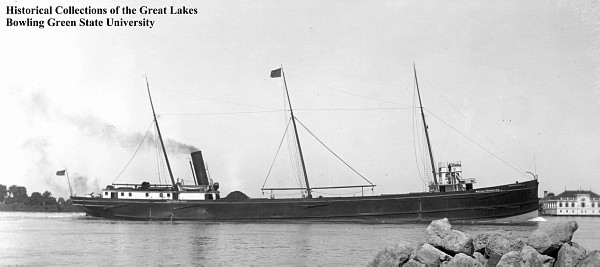
- Northern Wave (right)

History
- Name: Northern Wave
- Owner: Northern Steamship Co. 1889–1903; Mutual Transit Co. 1903–1916; Great Lakes Transit Co. 1916–1917; U.S. Shipping Board 1917–1920; West Indies Navigation Co. 1920–1922; Gulf Export Co. 1922–1926
- Builder: Globe Iron Works Company
- Launched: 1889
- Identification: Hull number: 00022; Official number: 130437
- Fate: Scrapped, 1926

General characteristics
- Type: Steamer
- Tonnage: 2,476 GRT; 1,885 NRT
- Length: 299.42
- Depth: 24.5
- Installed power: Steam generator: 2 × Scotch boilers

Northern Wave was an American large steel steamer built by Globe Iron Works Company and used on the Great Lakes. Northern Wave was launched in 1889 and scrapped in 1926. It was one of eight steamships owned by the Northern Steamship Company of Buffalo. The Northern Steamship Company was created in 1888 by Jerome Hill, who was also in the railroad business. During World War I the ship was moved to the Atlantic as a part of the war effort.

In 1891 the ship had a gross earnings of US$106,000.

From 1891 to 1896 the chief engineer was a Canadian named Frederick Potts.

In 1919 the radio stations onboard were controlled by the Marconi Wireless Telegraph Co.

The ship was also involved in a 1924 lawsuit, where the court decided that a lack of investigation is not prejudicial if such investigation would have been useless.

The ship was finally sold to Italian shipbreakers in 1925 and scrapped the next year in Genoa, Italy.

== Ownership ==
The Northern Wave was owned by the Mutual Transit Co. as of 1907 under the Captain D. L. Cartwright. After the Mutual Transit Co., the Northern Wave was owned by the Great Lakes Transit Corporation in 1916. The U.S. Shipping Board is listed as the owner from 1917 to 1920.

== Design ==
The Northern Wave was similarly made to five of the other ships owned by the company. It was a steel freight ship weighing 2,500 tons. James Croil of Montreal in 1989 described these ships as "perhaps the finest fleet of steamers on the Great Lakes." The Northern Wave had two Scotch boilers.

== Rescue of the M. M. Drake ==
In 1901 the Northern Wave, along with another steamer, the Crescent City, rescued crews from the M. M. Drake and the schooner-barge Michigan, which M. M. Drake was towing. There was only one casualty. While rescuing the crews the Northern Wave did collide with the M. M. Drake, but suffered no damage.

== Portage Bridge collision ==
In 1905 the Northern Wave collided with the Portage Bridge, requiring the center swinging section of the bridge to be replaced.

== Rebuild ==
In 1917 the ship was moved to the Atlantic Coast and rebuilt, to a new tonnage of 2,599 gross register tons (GRT) and 1,526 net register tons (NRT). This was due to World War I, when the U.S. Shipping Company moved ships from the Great Lakes for use in the war effort.
