= USS Acubens =

Cargo ship of the United States Navy

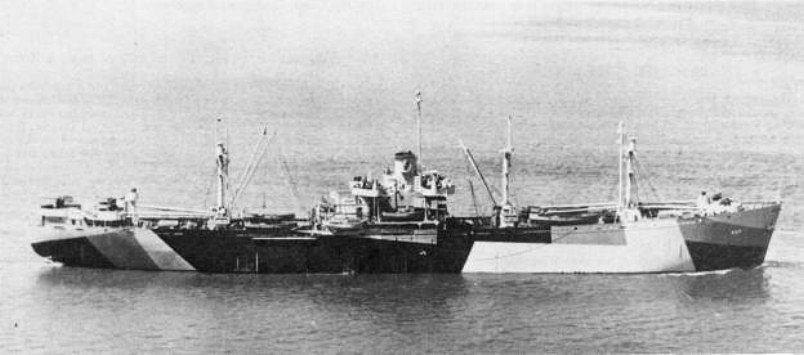
- USS Acubens (AKS-5)

History

United States
- Name: Acubens
- Namesake: Acubens
- Builder: Delta Shipbuilding Company, New Orleans
- Laid down: 25 November 1943
- Launched: 8 January 1944
- Acquired: 9 February 1944
- Commissioned: 15 July 1944
- Decommissioned: 11 March 1946
- Stricken: 17 July 1947
- Fate: Sold for scrapping, 14 October 1964

General characteristics
- Class & type: Acubens-class general stores issue ship
- Displacement: 14,550 long tons (14,783 t)
- Length: 441 ft 6 in (135 m)
- Beam: 56 ft 11 in (17.35 m)
- Draft: 28 ft 4 in (8.64 m)
- Propulsion: Reciprocating steam engine, single shaft, 2,500 shp (1,864 kW)
- Speed: 12.5 knots (23.2 km/h; 14.4 mph)
- Complement: 193
- Armament: 1 × 5-inch/38-caliber gun; 4 × 3-inch/50-caliber guns; 4 × 40 mm guns; 20 × 20 mm guns

USS Acubens (AKS-5) was an Acubens-class general stores issue ship commissioned by the U.S. Navy for service in World War II, named after the star Acubens, the alpha star in Cancer. She was responsible for delivering and disbursing goods and equipment to locations in the war zone.

Acubens was laid down under a Maritime Commission contract (MCE hull 1935) as the Liberty ship SS Jean Louis on 25 November 1943 by the Delta Shipbuilding Co., New Orleans, Louisiana. Launched on 8 January 1944; sponsored by Mrs. J. A. Farrington; acquired by the U.S. Navy on 9 February 1944; converted for naval service by Todd-Johnson Drydocks, Inc., New Orleans; and commissioned on 15 July 1944.

== Service history ==
=== World War II Pacific operations ===
Following shakedown out of Norfolk, Virginia, and a short run to New York City, Acubens sailed for the Panama Canal on 8 September and entered the Pacific. The Acubens was part of a convoy heading for New Guinea, but had to drop out because of a main bearing burning up. After repairs, the ship dropped anchor at Hollandia, New Guinea, on 25 October and remained there until 10 November issuing stores to vessels of Task Force 76. On the 10th, Acubens transported a load of ammunition to Brisbane, Australia. The ship left Australia on 13 December bound for the Philippines and reached Leyte on the 21st.

Acubens remained based in the Philippines for the duration of the war. Her routine consisted of loading stores at Milne Bay, New Guinea; proceeding to Manus Island to load more provisions, then steaming back to the Philippines to distribute her cargo. Acubens departed the Philippines on 25 November 1945, bound via Pearl Harbor for the California coast.

=== Decommissioning ===
The stores ship arrived at San Francisco on 22 December. Shortly thereafter, work was begun to prepare the ship for decommissioning. Acubens got underway on 18 January 1946 to return to Pearl Harbor, where she was to be laid up.

Acubens was decommissioned on 11 March 1946. The ship was transferred to the National Defense Reserve Fleet at Suisun Bay on 20 June 1947, struck from the Naval Register on 17 July 1947 and sold for scrap on 14 October 1964.
