= General stores issue ship =

Type of ship used by the United States Navy

General stores issue ship is a type of ship used by the United States Navy during World War II and for some time afterwards.

The task of the general stores issue ship was to sail into non-combat, or rear, areas and disburse general stores, such as canned goods, toilet paper, office supplies, etc., to ships and stations.

== Operations ==
Commanding officers and supply officers of ships and stations would sign requisitions for what they required, and a small boat, such as an LCVP, would make the trip to the general stores issue ship to have the requisitions filled.

General stores issue ships would provision in the States before sailing to the non-combat areas. However, rather than sail back to the United States to re-provision, they would often remain at their location and provision from general cargo ships sent from the States to replenish their stores.

For example, USS Pollux, homeported in Yokosuka, Japan, during the 1960s, maintained an inventory of 25,000 line items, supplying Seventh Fleet units with numerous items, augmented by other supply vessels delivering specialty materials, including foods, ammunition, and fuels. During a typical underway replenishment of a naval grouping (usually a squadron), Pollux would deliver supplies, via cargo nets and highline, while steaming at typically 15 knots, alongside receiving ships. Overall material could include hundreds of items, at a typical weight total to 120 tons to an aircraft carrier, 25-35 tons to a cruiser, 6-10 tons to a destroyer, as well as commensurate amounts to auxiliary ships (troop carriers, repair vessels, etc.). Along with the emphasis of underway replenishment (UNREPs), also delivered supplies to ships in various ports as well (INREPs). It has been estimated that Pollux alone supplied as much as one-sixth of Seventh Fleet's general logistical needs.

== Example of use ==
An example of use of the requisition system used by the general stores issue ship can be found in the narrative of USS Volans.
