= SS James Gayley =

American lake freighter (1902–1912)

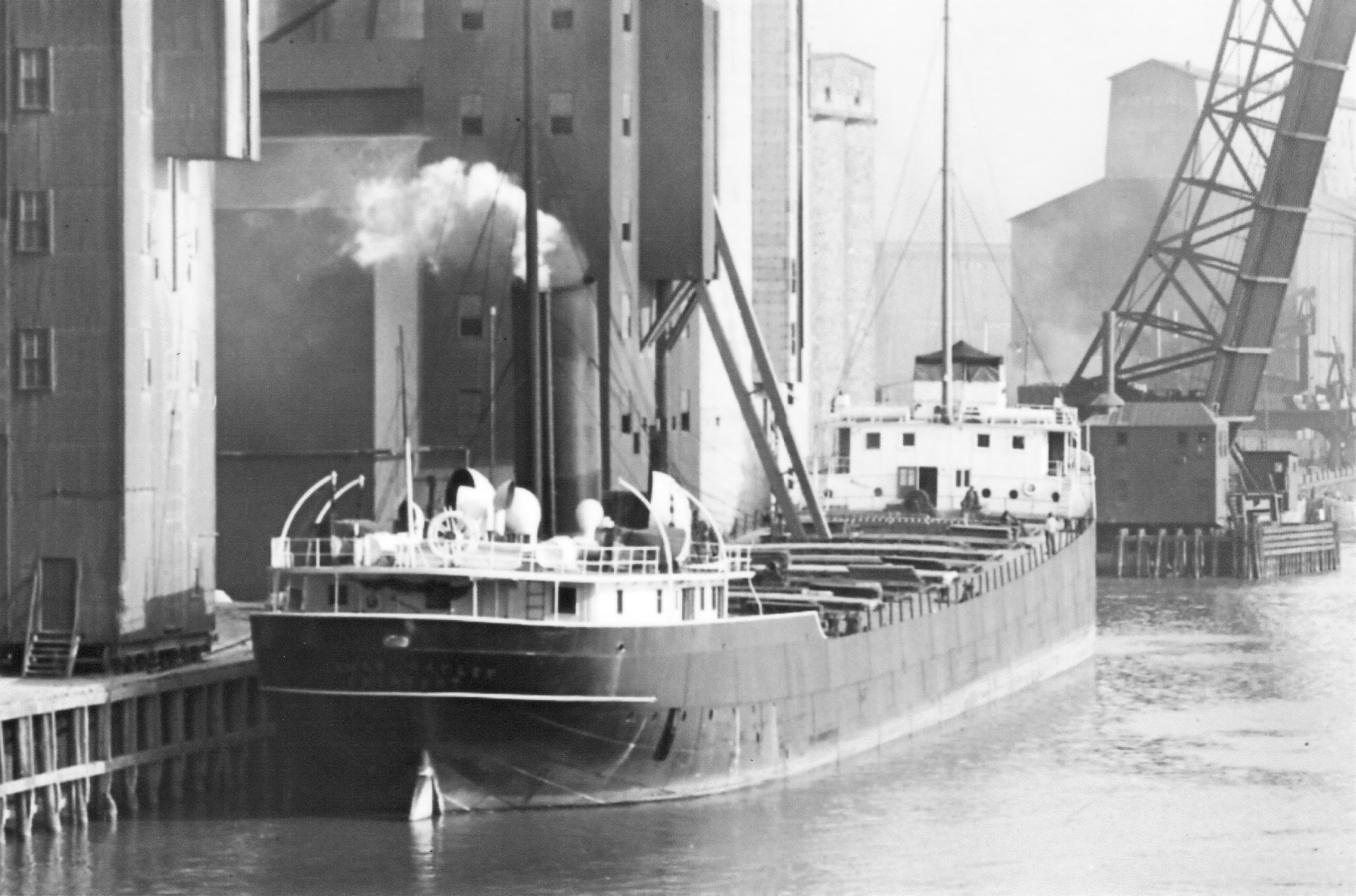
- James Gayley in Buffalo, New York, c. 1910

History

United States
- Name: James Gayley
- Namesake: James Gayley
- Owner: Mitchell & Company
- Operator: Cleveland Steamship Company
- Port of registry: Fairport, Ohio
- Builder: American Ship Building Company, Cleveland, Ohio
- Cost: $260,000 ($7.6 million in 2024) (Note: Johnston, Louis & Williamson, Samuel H. (2023). "What Was the U.S. GDP Then?". MeasuringWorth. United States Gross Domestic Product deflator figures follow the MeasuringWorth series.)
- Yard number: 410
- Launched: 29 March 1902
- Christened: Mary Gayley
- Maiden voyage: 15 May – 27 May 1902
- Out of service: 7 August 1912
- Identification: US official number 77523
- Fate: Sank on Lake Superior

General characteristics
- Class & type: Lake freighter
- Tonnage: 4,777 GRT; 3,359 NRT
- Length: 436 feet (132.9 m) (o/a); 416 feet (126.8 m) (p/p)
- Beam: 50 feet (15.2 m)
- Depth: 28 feet (8.5 m) (moulded)
- Installed power: Engine: 1 × 1,480 ihp (1,100 kW) 90 rpm triple expansion steam engine; Boilers: 2 × 170 pounds per square inch (1,200 kPa) Scotch marine boilers
- Propulsion: 1 × propeller
- Capacity: 7,000 long tons (7,112 t) (Note: Some sources listed her capacity as 6,200 long tons (6,299 t) on a 18-foot (5.5 m) draught, or 6,600 long tons (6,706 t).)
- Crew: 23

SS James Gayley was an American lake freighter in service between 1902 and 1912. She was built by the American Ship Building Company in Cleveland, Ohio, for the Cleveland Steamship Company. Upon the end of her maiden voyage on 27 May 1902, James Gayley became the inaugural vessel to utilise the automatic Hulett unloading rigs in Conneaut, Ohio, to discharge her cargo of iron ore loaded in Two Harbors, Minnesota. She hauled ore, coal and grain, and is known to have been involved in two accidents prior to her loss.

On 6 August 1912, at 12:00 (EST), James Gayley passed through the Soo Locks into Lake Superior with a cargo of coal she had loaded in Buffalo, New York, four days earlier, bound for Duluth, Minnesota. She was under the command of Captain Millard M. Stewart. A thick fog shrouded the lake, greatly restricting visibility. Early on the following day, while about 43 miles (69.2 km) east of Manitou Island, she was struck on her starboard side, aft of her collision bulkhead by the ore-laden freighter Rensselaer. As James Gayley began to sink rapidly, her crew and passengers were taken aboard Rensselaer, and were later transferred to the freighter Stadacona. James Gayley sank in between 16 and 20 minutes, while Rensselaer survived the collision, albeit with a severely damaged bow. In the aftermath of the accident, both the captain of Rensselaer and the first mate of James Gayley had their licenses suspended.

The wreck of James Gayley has never been found. As of 2026, she is the second largest undiscovered shipwreck both on Lake Superior and on the Great Lakes generally, behind the freighter D. M. Clemson.

== History ==
=== Background ===
In 1843, the gunship USS Michigan became the first iron-hulled vessel built on the Great Lakes upon her launching in Erie, Pennsylvania. Though Canadian merchants were importing iron vessels prefabricated in the United Kingdom by the mid-1840s, the first regionally produced iron-hulled merchant vessel, Merchant, would not be built until 1862. Despite Merchant's clear success proving the potential of iron hulls, ships built from wood remained preferable until the 1880s due to their lower cost, as well as the abundance of high-quality timber and workers trained in carpentry. Between the early 1870s and the mid-1880s, shipyards around the Great Lakes began to construct iron ships on a relatively large scale.

In 1884, the first steel freighters were built on the Great Lakes, with metal becoming a material used in the construction of new hulls by the 1890s. Rapidly decreasing steel prices, combined with the development of the pneumatic rivet gun and the advancement of gantry cranes enabling shipyard employees to work at an increased speed and with greater efficiency, contributed to the rapid increase in the size of lake freighters in the late 19th and early 20th centuries.

Throughout the 1880s, the iron ore trade on the Great Lakes grew quickly, primarily due to the increasing size of the lake freighters and the rise in the number of trips they made to the ore docks of Lake Superior. With the railways unable to keep up with the rapid extraction of iron ore, bulk freighters became an integral component in the region's iron ore industry. By 1890, 57% of the 16,000,000 long tons (16,256,751 t) of the iron ore produced by mines in the United States was sourced from the region surrounding Lake Superior.

John Mitchell was a Canadian-American businessman and licensed vessel master primarily active in the Great Lakes shipping industry. Although Mitchell operated a large fleet of vessels of various sizes and materials, its most famous members consisted of eleven almost identical steel freighters built between 1898 and 1905, designed by Mitchell himself. (Note: In order of construction, they were Hendrick S. Holden, H. C. Frick, M. A. Hanna, William E. Reis, Walter Scranton, John J. Albright, James Gayley, William H. Gratwick, Frank H. Goodyear, Moses Taylor, and Pendennis White.)

=== Design and construction ===
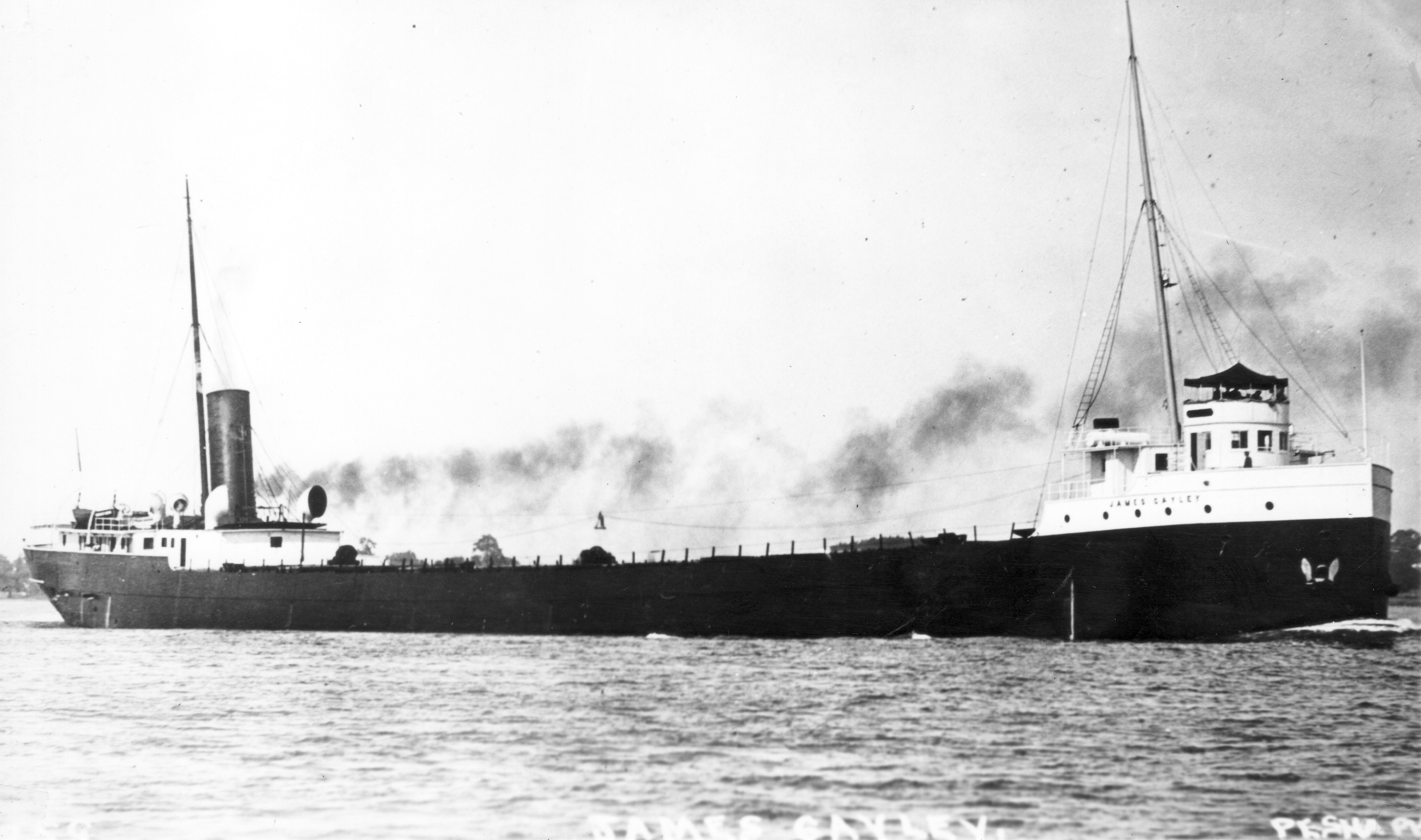
James Gayley, photographed by Louis Pesha, displaying the characteristics typical of a Mitchell freighter

Freighters designed by Mitchell were considered to be especially aesthetically pleasing in design, with the Toronto Marine Historical Society of Toronto, Ontario, describing them as "very handsome steel-hulled steamers", stating very few other contemporaneous vessels could "rival them for their good looks", and "special lines". Their hulls exhibited uncharacteristically curved hull sheer in comparison with other freighters of the era. Their pilothouses were similarly distinctive. They were described as "turret style", featuring a squared-off front, inlaid with three large, sectioned windows. Mitchell's eleven freighters were noted for their robust construction as well as for their appearance.

James Gayley was built within the slip of the former Globe Iron Works Company shipyard by the American Ship Building Company in Cleveland, Ohio. Assigned the yard number 410, she was named in honour of James Gayley, a chemist and metallurgist who was head of the ore department, and the first vice president of the United States Steel Corporation. Customary to launching traditions on the Great Lakes, James Gayley was launched on a Saturday, shortly after 11:00, on 29 March 1902. She was christened by her namesake's daughter, Mary Gayley. Built to the most common dimensions prevailing among lake freighters at the time, James Gayley's construction cost $260,000 (equivalent to $7.6 million in 2024). At the time of her launch, The Cleveland Leader described her as possessing some of the finest furnishings on the lakes.

She was built on the channel system, a longitudinal frame style introduced on the Great Lakes in the mid-1890s. It consisted of several rows of flanged steel plates running the entire length of a vessel's bottom, deriving its name from the "channels" between the frames. This method provided vessels with additional strength, as well as preventing damage sustained in groundings from spreading to other areas of the hull, and increasing cargo capacity. In spite of rapid advances in shipbuilding technology, the cargo hold of James Gayley remained reminiscent of those found on older wooden lake freighters. Between 1882 and 1904, the cargo holds of all iron and steel freighters contained stanchions, vertical columns designed to support their decks; and steel angles which were the equivalent of the knees used on wooden freighters. Her twelve hatches, which were longitudinally 8 feet (2.4 m) in depth, were positioned 24 feet (7.3 m) apart, when measured from their centres. This configuration complicated the loading and unloading of cargo, since the chutes of most ore docks were set 12 feet (3.7 m) apart, while the stanchions frequently obstructed the buckets of automated unloading rigs, frequently receiving damage from them during unloading. (Note: It would not be until 1904 that the traditional construction methods were dispensed with in favour of steel arches and sloped side "hopper" tanks, in the freighter Augustus B. Wolvin.) James Gayley's hull contained three watertight bulkheads. Her cargo hold was divided into four separate compartments, the first of which was 1,650 long tons (1,676 t) in capacity, the second and third were 1,600 long tons (1,626 t), while the fourth was 1,850 long tons (1,880 t). Her overall capacity was listed as 7,000 long tons (7,112 t).

The hull of James Gayley had an overall length of 436 feet (132.9 m), a length between perpendiculars of 416 feet (126.8 m), as well as a beam 50 feet (15.2 m) in width. The moulded depth, roughly speaking, the vertical height of James Gayley's hull, was 28 feet (8.5 m). The measurements of her register tonnage were calculated as 4,777 gross register tons and 3,359 net register tons, respectively.

James Gayley was powered by a 1,480 ihp (1,100 kW) 90 rpm triple-expansion steam engine; the cylinders of the engine were 22 inches (55.9 cm), 35 inches (88.9 cm) and 58 inches (147.3 cm) in diameter, and had a stroke of 40 inches (101.6 cm). Steam was provided by two Scotch marine boilers 13 feet 2 inches (4.0 m) in diameter, 11 feet 6 inches (3.5 m) in length, with a working pressure of 170 pounds per square inch (1,200 kPa). The boilers were each fitted with four furnaces, accounting for a combined grate surface of 88 square feet (8.2 m^{2}), and a total heating surface of 4,292 square feet (398.7 m^{2}). Both the engine and boilers were manufactured by James Gayley's builder.

=== Service history ===
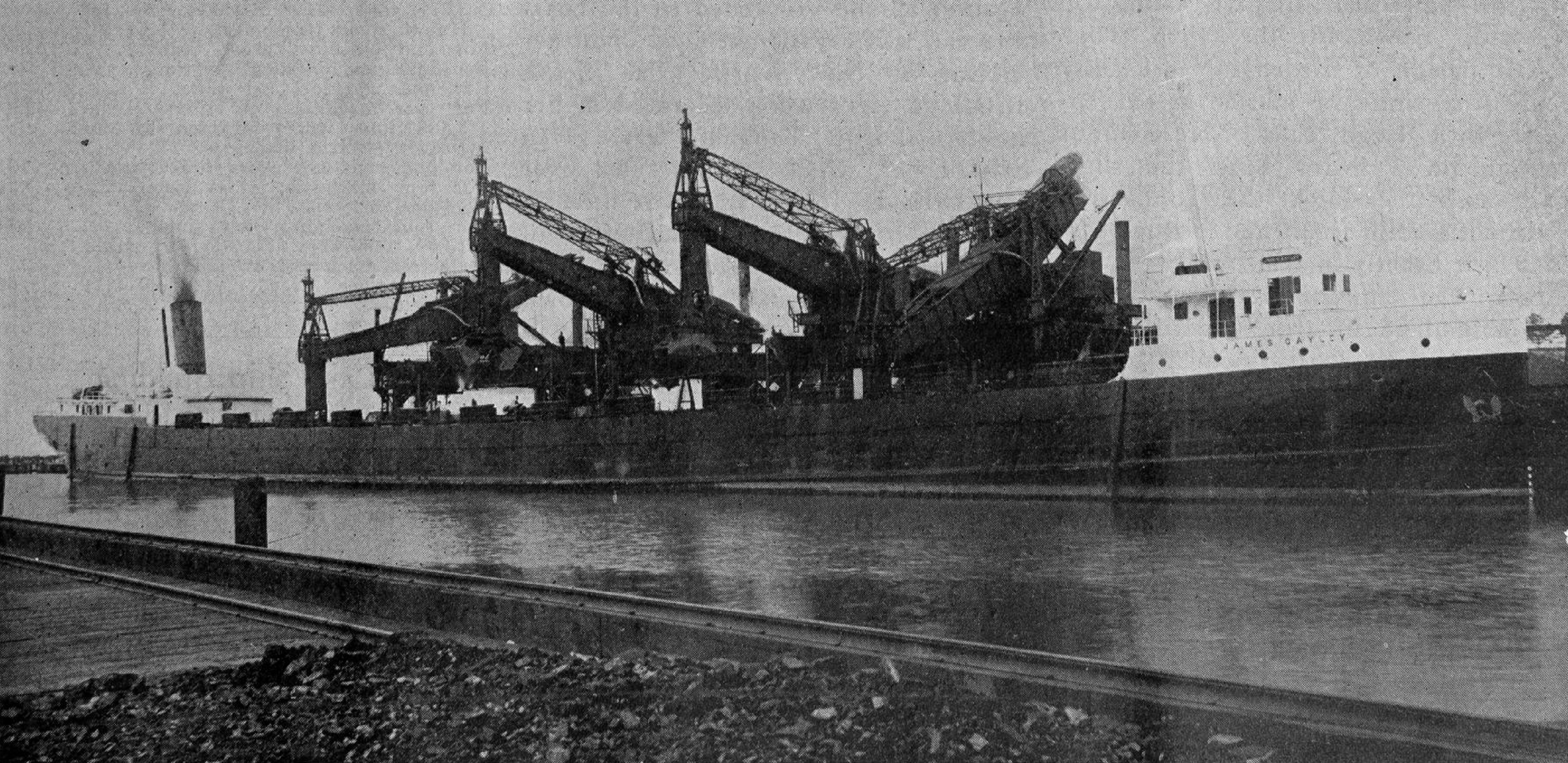
James Gayley unloading her cargo at the Huletts in Conneaut, Ohio, on 27 May 1902

James Gayley was built for the Cleveland Steamship Company, a subsidiary of Mitchell & Company, managed by Mitchell, who also served as its president and manager. Her US official number was 77523, while her port of registry was Fairport, Ohio. She was involved in the ore, coal, and grain trades.

In an effort to reduce United States Steel's dependence on dock workers, James Gayley's namesake championed the Huletts, a type of clamshell bucket scoop invented by and named after George H. Hulett of Akron, Ohio, installing them at Conneaut, Ohio, upon his ascension to vice president of United States Steel. Michell, influenced by the recent installation of the Huletts in Conneaut, made the decision to alter the hull of James Gayley while she was under construction. Her hatches were enlarged, her hold stanchions were repositioned and the tween deck present on earlier vessels was eliminated to allow the unloading machinery better access to the cargo hold. (Note: The absence of a tween deck would become a standard feature of lake freighters within two years.)

On 15 May 1902, James Gayley cleared Cleveland, without cargo, bound for Two Harbors, Minnesota. (Note: One source stated she was bound for Duluth, Minnesota.) She passed upbound through the Soo Locks at 14:00 EST on 19 May. After arriving in Two Harbors, on 21 May, she proceeded to load 6,088 long tons (6,186 t) of iron ore. She cleared the port by 23 May. After crossing Lake Superior, James Gayley passed down through the Soo Locks at 14:00 on 23 May, and passed Detroit, Michigan, at 20:20 the following day. She arrived in Conneaut harbour on 26 May, and left for Duluth, that same day. She unloaded 95% of her cargo with the automatic unloading rigs the following day, becoming the first vessel on the Great Lakes to do so.

While travelling south on Whitefish Bay on 17 May 1906, James Gayley was involved in a minor collision with the package freighter Troy. She passed downward through the Soo Locks, onto Lake Huron, at 13:30 EST that same day.

On the morning of 26 October 1907, while travelling upbound on the St. Clair River, laden with coal, James Gayley collided with the unladen, similarly upbound freighter Joseph G. Butler Jr. off Harsens Island. (Note: Contemporary sources referred to Joseph G. Butler Jr. as Joseph Butler or Joseph G. Butler, while the Bowling Green State University lists her full name.) After the collision, James Gayley continued her voyage. While Joseph G. Butler Jr. was undamaged, James Gayley became one of the most seriously damaged vessels on the Great Lakes that year. In addition to significant damage to her port bow, James Gayley's superstructure sheer strake were stove in by 1 foot (0.3 m), and she lost her anchor. She was repaired in Buffalo, New York, between late 1907 and early 1908.

=== Final voyage ===
Approximate location of the collision

James Gayley arrived in Buffalo, from Cleveland, without cargo on 1 August 1912. She departed the port the following day, laden with 7,000 long tons (7,112 t) coal, bound for Duluth, under the command of Captain Millard M. Stewart. (Note: Some sources claim 7,100 long tons (7,214 t) of coal.) On board were a complement of 23 crewmen, as well as five passengers, all women from New York. James Gayley steamed north past Detroit at 17:40 EST on 4 August, and passed by Port Huron, Michigan, at 03:20 the following morning. She headed into Lake Superior after making her way up through the Soo Locks, at 12:00 on 6 August.

An almost impenetrable fog shrouded Lake Superior, which, in addition to heavy rain, restricted visibility to a few feet. As James Gayley neared the Keweenaw Peninsula early on 7 August, about 43 miles (69.2 km) east of Manitou Island, her crew spotted the freighter Rensselaer of the Pittsburgh Steamship Company bearing down on them with great speed. Rensselaer, downbound for Cleveland, with a cargo of iron ore was under the command of Captain Carleton D. Secord, with the likewise ore-laden barge George H. Corliss in tow. Upon sighting the other freighter heading towards them, Stewart went below decks to rouse the passengers, who were asleep in their staterooms at the time. The five women managed to reach the deck immediately before Rensselaer struck James Gayley at 01:35, on her starboard side. The damage sustained was located aft of the forward deck house on her bow, reportedly behind her collision bulkhead. (Note: A later report by Dr. Julius F. Wolff Jr. stated James Gayley was struck on her port side, 65 feet (19.8 m) aft of her bow.) As Stewart assessed the damage to James Gayley, he realised his vessel was sinking rapidly, and ordered the launch of the lifeboats. However, while Rensselaer had initially veered off, she was brought alongside James Gayley. The two vessels were lashed together, allowing for most people aboard to leave.

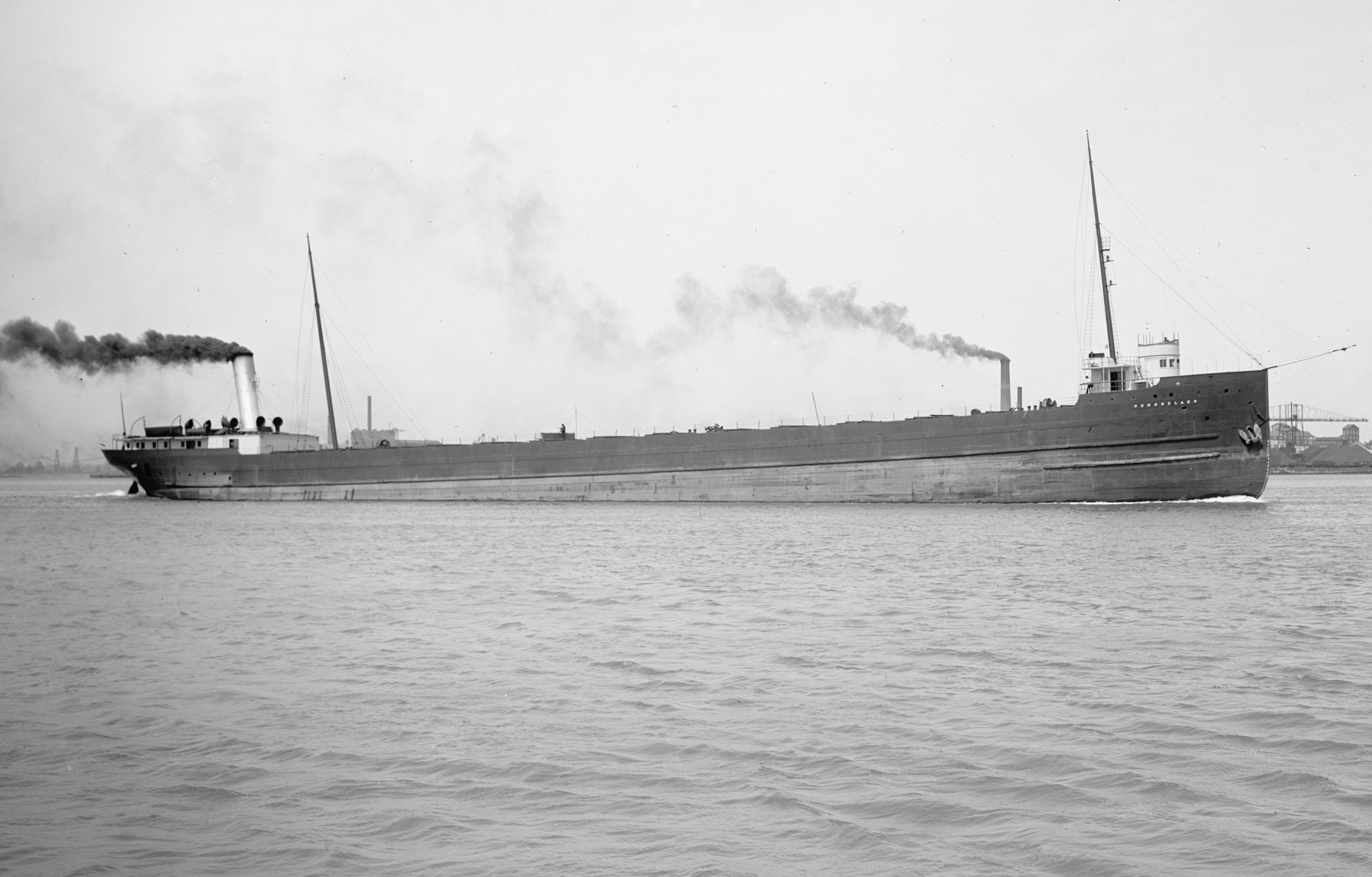
Rensselaer in 1903

Within ten minutes, everyone had disembarked from the sinking vessel. Stewart was the final person to leave. Between 16 and 20 minutes after the two freighters collided, James Gayley had dropped below the surface. 19 members of the crew and all five passengers were taken aboard Rensselaer, while four crewmen, including first mate Alfred Morton, were picked up by George H. Corliss. Receiving significant damage to her bow, Rensselaer initially appeared to be sinking as well. She began sounding distress calls, which alerted the freighter Stadacona, which had passed through the Soo Locks about two hours after James Gayley, about an hour after the collision. The passengers and members of James Gayley's crew were transferred to Stadacona, receiving passage to Duluth. George H. Corliss was picked up by the freighter J. H. Bartow, which towed her to the Soo Locks. The four crewmen of James Gayley taken aboard the barge were transferred to the freighter William C. Agnew, which took them to Cleveland.

Rensselaer's damaged bow was patched with canvas and her forward collision bulkhead was braced, in aid of keeping her afloat. Despite the damage to her bow, her bulkhead held, allowing her to reach Marquette, Michigan, under her own power, where she received temporary repairs.

=== Aftermath and wreck ===
Although Stewart declined to discuss the events of the collision upon his arrival in Duluth, he praised Secord and Captain James Cannaly of Stadacona, while his own comportment in ensuring the safety of the people aboard James Gayley was praised by his passengers. One of the five passengers in particular, E. G. Russel, paid tribute to Stewart in the immediate aftermath of James Gayley's loss:

The captain came to our stateroom and told us gently and calmly that a boat had hit us, so the five of us went on deck in our night dresses and bare footed. It was raining hard and the fog was very thick. The captain said he knew our vessel was doomed and he ordered the lifeboats over the side. However, the captain of the Rensselaer ran up alongside and lashed the boats together. The girls were transferred and then the other boat drifted away, breaking the ropes. We thought then that we were in for it, but the Rensselaer again steamed alongside and the rest of us were taken over. We thought at first the Rensselaer was also sinking and the captain of that boat began whistling for help. After more than an hour the signals were answered and we all cheered as the Stadacona appeared through the fog.

Neither James Gayley nor Rensselaer were insured by their respective owners. In order to ascertain the responsibilities for the accident, the testimonies of crews of both vessels were recorded in Cleveland, in August 1912, and presented to the lawyers responsible for arbitrating the case. A report published by the Detroit Free Press on 9 August speculated James Gayley had directly contravened Rule 14 of the US pilot rules by travelling at an excessive speed. (Note: Rule 14 stipulates "every steam shall, in thick weather by fog, falling snow, heavy rainstorms or other causes, go at moderate speed".) Harvey D. Goulder represented the owners of James Gayley, while H. A. Kelley, an attorney for the Pittsburgh Steamship Company acted on behalf of Rensselaer.

By 3 September, Mitchell and Harry Coulby, the president of the Pittsburgh Steamship Company had settled out of court, electing to split the damages. James Gayley and her cargo were worth about $330,000 (equivalent to $7.74 million in 2024), while the repair costs to Rensselaer amounted to $10,000 (equivalent to $235,000 in 2024). (Note: James Gayley alone was estimated to be worth around $250,000 (equivalent to $5.86 million in 2024).) From 15 October, Secord and Morton had their licenses suspended for 20 and 30 days respectively by the steamboat inspectors in Marquette. Secord appealed his sentence to Captain Charles H. Westcott, supervising steamboat inspector for the eighth district of Buffalo. Westcott upheld the sentence.

The wreck of James Gayley has never been found. As of 2026, she is the second largest undiscovered shipwreck, both on Lake Superior and on the Great Lakes, behind the 468-foot (142.6 m) freighter D. M. Clemson. (Note: The 550 foot (167.6 m) Canadian freighter James Carruthers, lost during the Great Lakes Storm of 1913, was previously the largest shipwreck on the Great Lakes, prior to her discovery in May 2025.)

== Sources ==
- "1903 Blue Book of American Shipping". Cleveland, Ohio: The Marine Review Publishing Company. 1903. p. 225 – via Maritime History of the Great Lakes.
- "Accidents of the Month". The Marine Review. 36 (20). Cleveland, Ohio: The Marine Review: 28 – 29. 1907 – via Maritime History of the Great Lakes.
- "Around the Lakes". The Marine Review. 36 (18). Cleveland, Ohio: The Marine Review: 24 – 25. 1907 – via Maritime History of the Great Lakes.
- "Arrivals and Clearances". The Duluth News Tribune. 22 May 1902. p. 12 – via Newspapers.com.
- Baillod, Brendon (2025). "Lost Leviathans: Lake Superior". Madison, Wisconsin: Great Lakes Shipwreck Research – via Prezi.
- Bowlus, W. Bruce (2010). Iron Ore Transport on the Great Lakes: The Development of a Delivery System to Feed American Industry. Jefferson, North Carolina: McFarland & Company, Inc. ISBN 978-0-786433-26-1.
- Bugbee, Gordon P. (February 1962a). "Iron Merchant Ships: An Upper Lakes Centennial - Part One" (PDF). Telescope. 11 (2). Detroit: Great Lakes Maritime Institute: 24–27 – via Maritime History of the Great Lakes.
- Bugbee, Gordon P. (March 1962b). "Iron Merchant Ships: An Upper Lakes Cenntenial – Part Two" (PDF). Telescope. 11 (3). Detroit: Great Lakes Maritime Institute: 46–51 – via Maritime History of the Great Lakes.
- "Bulk Freighters Built Since 1902". The Marine Review. 42 (2). Cleveland, Ohio: The Marine Review: 65. 1912 – via Maritime History of the Great Lakes.
- "Butler, Joseph G., Jr". Bowling Green, Ohio: Bowling Green State University. Archived from the original on 7 February 2023 – via Historical Collections of the Great Lakes.
- "Captain Stewart's Bravery". The Buffalo Times. 11 August 1912. p. 25 – via Newspapers.com.
- "Channel System of Ship Construction". The Marine Review. 11 (18). Cleveland, Ohio: The Marine Review: 6. 2 May 1895 – via Maritime History of the Great Lakes.
- "Channel System of Construction". The Marine Review. 12 (12). Cleveland, Ohio: 13–22. 12 September 1895 – via Maritime History of the Great Lakes.
- "Choctaw Shipwreck Site National Register of Historic Places Registration Form" (PDF). Washington D.C.: National Park Service. 2018. Archived from the original (PDF) on 1 January 2019.
- "Cleveland Freighter Lost in Collision on Lake Superior". The Cleveland Leader. 8 August 1912. p. 11 – via Newspapers.com.
- "Cleveland Port List". Cleveland, Ohio: The Plain Dealer. 16 May 1902. p. 7 – via Newspapers.com.
- "Crash in Fog Sinks Steamer off Keweenaw". Detroit Free Press. 8 August 1912. p. 1 – via Newspapers.com.
- "Gayley, James". Bowling Green, Ohio: Bowling Green State University. 2021. Archived from the original on 29 July 2021 – via Historical Collections of the Great Lakes.
- Gillam, Skip (3 January 1993). "Collision Sent James Gayley to an Untimely, Watery Grave". Port Huron, Michigan: The Times Herald. p. 22 – via Newspapers.com.
- Gillam, Skip (2012). "Shipwreck: James Gayley And Rensselaer" (PDF). Washington D.C.: National Oceanic and Atmospheric Administration.
- Green, Fred W. (1912). "Mitchell & Co.'s Marine Directory of the Great Lakes – 1912". Cleveland, Ohio: Bureau Veritas – via Maritime History of the Great Lakes.
- Herriman, H. N. (1905). "Great Lakes Register – For the Construction and Classification of Steel and Wooden Vessels – 1905". Chicago, Illinois: Lakeside Press – via Maritime History of the Great Lakes.
- "How Fast Was the Gayley Going?". Detroit Free Press. 9 August 1912. p. 4 – via Newspapers.com.
- "James Gayley Launched". The Buffalo Commercial. 31 March 1902. p. 7 – via Newspapers.com.
- "James Gayley Launched". The Cleveland Leader. 30 March 1902. p. 5 – via Newspapers.com.
- "Lake Erie". Cleveland, Ohio: The Plain Dealer. 27 May 1902. p. 8 – via Newspapers.com.
- "Lake Marine News". Minneapolis Daily Times. 23 May 1902. p. 3 – via Newspapers.com.
- "Lake Ship Building and First Automatic Unloading". The Marine Review. 42 (9). Cleveland, Ohio: The Marine Review: 311 – 312. 1912 – via Maritime History of the Great Lakes.
- "License Suspension Stands". The Buffalo Commercial. 1 November 1912. p. 9 – via Newspapers.com.
- "Local Boats in Collision". Cleveland, Ohio: The Plain Dealer. 27 October 1907. p. 8 – via Newspapers.com.
- Lofton, Justine (2025). "Found: Largest Missing Shipwreck in the Great Lakes". Grand Rapids, Michigan: MLive Media Group.
- "Marine News". The Buffalo Enquirer. 3 September 1912. p. 5 – via Newspapers.com.
- "Marine News". Cleveland, Ohio: The Plain Dealer. 5 August 1912. p. 10 – via Newspapers.com.
- Mitchell Schaefer, Mary Louise; Fanslow, Pauline G. (1983). "A Family Affair – The Mitchell Steamship Company". Inland Seas. 39 (4). Toledo, Ohio: Great Lakes Historical Society: 249 – 254 – via National Museum of the Great Lakes.
- "Ore Discharging Machines". The Marine Record. 25 (28). Cleveland, Ohio: The Marine Record: 5. 1902 – via Maritime History of the Great Lakes.
- "Other Ports". The Cleveland Leader. 27 May 1902. p. 11 – via Newspapers.com.
- "Passages". The Cleveland Leader. 20 May 1902. p. 9 – via Newspapers.com.
- "Passages". The Cleveland Leader. 24 May 1902. p. 7 – via Newspapers.com.
- "Port Huron". Port Huron, Michigan: The Times Herald. 5 August 1912. p. 3 – via Newspapers.com.
- "Rensselaer – Gayley Collision". The Buffalo Commercial. 30 August 1912. p. 7 – via Newspapers.com.
- "Rensselaer Sinks Gayley off Manitou Island". The Buffalo News. 8 August 1912. p. 5 – via Newspapers.com.
- "Sault Ste. Marie". Port Huron, Michigan: The Times Herald. 6 August 1912. p. 9 – via Newspapers.com.
- "Ship of the Month No. 168: Saskadoc". The Scanner. 21 (2). Toronto, Ontario: Toronto Marine Historical Society: 7 – 11. 1988 – via Maritime History of the Great Lakes.
- "Ship of the Month No. 254: Major". The Scanner. 32 (6). Toronto, Ontario: Toronto Marine Historical Society: 4 – 11. 2000 – via Maritime History of the Great Lakes.
- "Ship of the Month No. 255: Stephen M. Clement". The Scanner. 32 (7). Toronto, Ontario: Toronto Marine Historical Society: 4 – 10. 2000 – via Maritime History of the Great Lakes.
- "Steamer Gayley Launched". Cleveland, Ohio: The Plain Dealer. 30 March 1902. p. 11 – via Newspapers.com.
- "Steamer James Gayley". Cleveland, Ohio: The Plain Dealer. 12 March 1902. p. 8 – via Newspapers.com.
- "Steel Bulk Freighter of 400-Foot Class is Lost in Collision in Fog on Lake Superior". Detroit Free Press. 8 August 1912. p. 12 – via Newspapers.com.
- Stonehouse, Frederick (1990) [1984]. Went Missing, II. Au Train, Michigan: Avery Color Studios. ISBN 978-0-932212-37-5.
- "Str. James Gayley Sinks, Rensselaer Makes Port, After Crash in Deep Fog". The Duluth News Tribune. 8 August 1912. p. 1 – via Newspapers.com.
- "The Soo". Detroit Free Press. 18 May 1906. p. 14 – via Newspapers.com.
- "The Steamer Gayley Sunk in Lake Superior by Steamer Rensselaer". The Buffalo Commercial. 8 August 1912. p. 9 – via Newspapers.com.
- "Things Worth Considering". The Marine Review. 36 (26). Cleveland, Ohio: The Marine Review: 31. 1907 – via Maritime History of the Great Lakes.
- Thompson, Mark L. (1994). Queen of the Lakes. Detroit, Michigan: Wayne State University Press. ISBN 0-8143-2393-6.
- "Tribute Paid to Captain and Crew". The Cleveland Leader. 9 August 1912. p. 11 – via Newspapers.com.
- "Tribute to the Bravery of Capt. Stewart of Steamer James Gayley". The Buffalo Commercial. 9 August 1912. p. 7 – via Newspapers.com.
- "Two Captains Suspended". The Buffalo Commercial. 8 October 1912. p. 13 – via Newspapers.com.
- "Vessel Movements – Lake Erie". The Cleveland Leader. 2 August 1912. p. 11 – via Newspapers.com.
- "Vessel Movements – Port of Buffalo". The Buffalo Commercial. 2 August 1912. p. 7 – via Newspapers.com.
- "Vessel Passages". The Duluth News Tribune. 25 May 1902. p. 14 – via Newspapers.com.
- Witsil, Frank (2025). "Lost in Lake Huron for More Than 100 Years, the Carruthers is Finally Found". Detroit, Michigan: Detroit Free Press.
- Wolff, Julius F. Jr. (1969). "Before the Days of Radar: Ship Collisions on Lake Superior". Inland Seas. 25 (2). Toledo, Ohio: Great Lakes Historical Society: 137 – 149 – via National Museum of the Great Lakes.
- Wolff, Julius F. Jr. (1990) [1979]. Lake Superior Shipwrecks: Complete Reference to Maritime Accidents and Disasters. Duluth, Minnesota: Lake Superior Port Cities Inc. ISBN 978-0-942235-01-2.
- "Wreck Blame Not Placed". Port Huron, Michigan: The Times Herald. 9 August 1912. p. 6 – via Newspapers.com.
