= SS James H. Reed =

American lake freighter (1903–1944)

Coordinates: 42°16′10.2″N 80°47′46.2″W

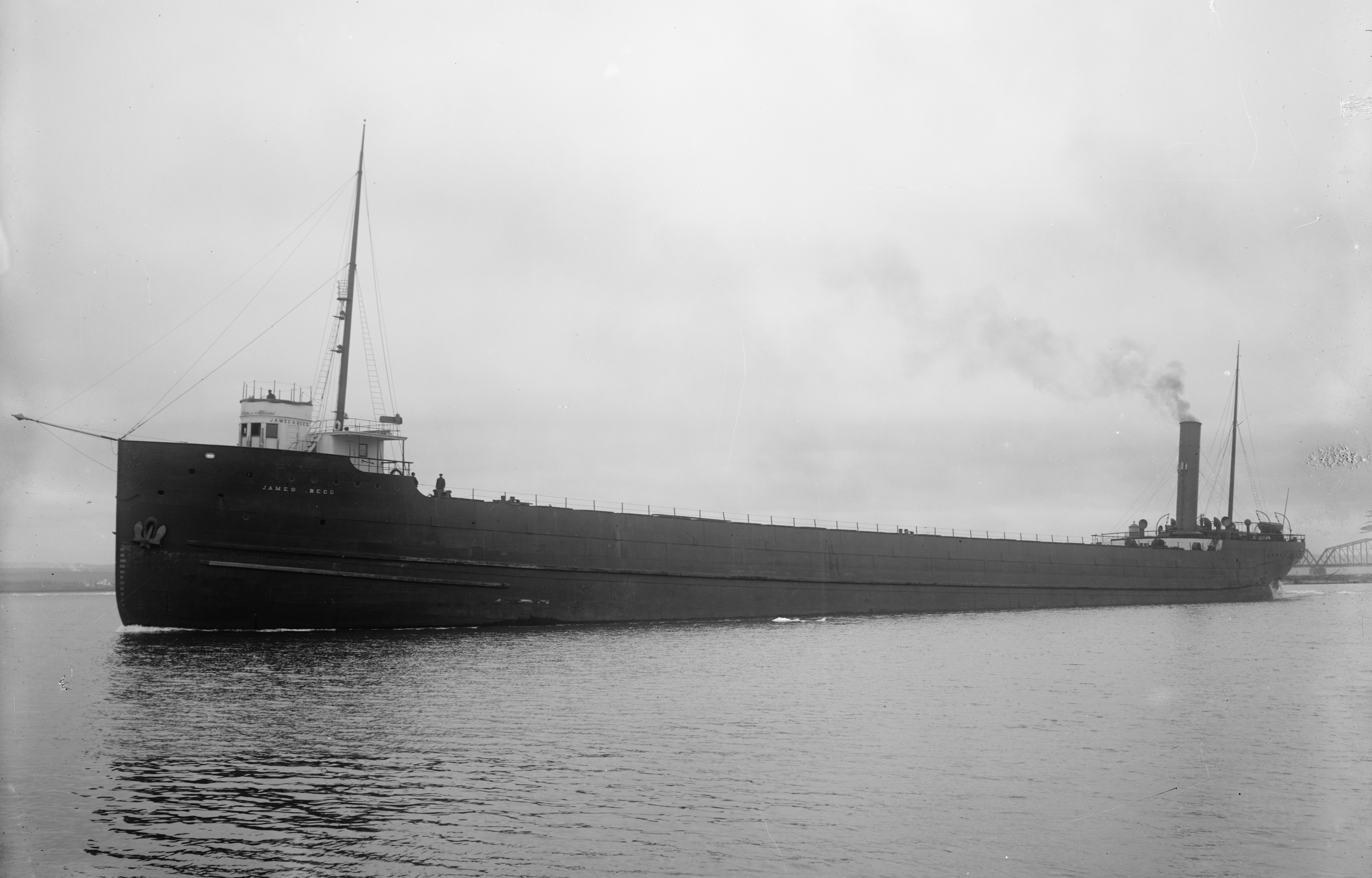

History

United States
- Name: James H. Reed
- Namesake: James Hay Reed
- Operator: Provident Steamship Company (1903–1913); Interlake Steamship Company (1913–1944)
- Port of registry: Fairport, Ohio
- Builder: Detroit Shipbuilding Company, Wyandotte, Michigan
- Yard number: 154
- Launched: 29 May 1903
- Maiden voyage: 21 July 1903
- Out of service: 27 April 1944
- Identification: US official number 77589
- Fate: Sank in a collision on Lake Erie

General characteristics
- Class & type: Lake freighter
- Sister ship(s): D. G. Kerr; D. M. Clemson
- Tonnage: 5,598 GRT; 4,125 NRT
- Length: 468 feet (142.6 m) o/a; 448 feet (136.6 m) p/p
- Beam: 52 feet (15.8 m)
- Depth: 28 feet (8.5 m)
- Installed power: Engine: 1 × 1,370 ihp (1,020 kW) 90 RPM quadruple expansion steam engine; Boilers: 2 × 250 pounds per square inch (1,700 kPa) water-tube boilers
- Propulsion: 1 × propeller
- Capacity: 7,300 long tons (7,417 t)
- Crew: 36

SS James H. Reed was an American lake freighter in service between 1903 and 1944. One of the largest freighters on the lakes at the time of her launching in 1903. She was built by the Detroit Shipbuilding Company in Wyandotte, Michigan, for the Provident Steamship Company of Duluth, Minnesota, managed by Augustus B. Wolvin. She served in the iron ore, coal and grain trade, and was involved in a number of accidents.

On 26 April 1944, as James H. Reed was headed from Escanaba, Michigan to Buffalo, New York, with a cargo of iron ore under the command of Captain Herbert Brightstone, she encountered thick fog over Lake Erie. Despite sounding fog signals, James H. Reed was unexpectedly rammed by the Canadian freighter Ashcroft at 05:30 EST, 42 miles (67.6 km) west of Long Point. James H. Reed was seriously damaged, sinking rapidly, killing 12 of her crew. The 24 survivors were rescued by Ashcroft and a US Coast Guard cutter.

After sinking into 76 feet (23.2 m) of water, James H. Reed's wreck was dynamited as a hazard to navigation in November 1944. She is the largest shipwreck in Lake Erie.

== History ==
=== Background ===
In 1843, the gunship USS Michigan became the first iron-hulled vessel built on the Great Lakes upon her launching in Erie, Pennsylvania. Though Canadian merchants were importing iron vessels prefabricated in the United Kingdom by the mid-1840s, the first regionally produced iron-hulled merchant vessel, Merchant, would not be built until 1862. Despite Merchant's clear success proving the potential of iron hulls, ships built from wood remained preferable until the 1880s due to their lower cost, as well as the abundance of high-quality timber and workers trained in carpentry. Between the early 1870s and the mid-1880s, shipyards around the Great Lakes began to construct iron ships on a relatively large scale.

In 1884, the first steel freighters were built on the Great Lakes, with metal becoming a material used in the construction of new hulls by the 1890s. Rapidly decreasing steel prices, combined with the development of the pneumatic rivet gun and the advancement of gantry cranes enabling shipyard employees to work at an increased speed and with greater efficiency, contributed to the rapid increase in the size of lake freighters in the late 19th and early 20th centuries.

Throughout the 1880s, the iron ore trade on the Great Lakes grew quickly, primarily due to the increasing size of the lake freighters and the rise in the number of trips they made to the ore docks of Lake Superior. With the railways unable to keep up with the rapid extraction of iron ore, bulk freighters became an integral component in the region's iron ore industry. By 1890, 57% of the 16,000,000 long tons (16,256,751 t) of the iron ore produced by mines in the United States was sourced from the region surrounding Lake Superior.

Augustus B. Wolvin was a prominent businessman in the Great Lakes shipping industry, based in Duluth, Minnesota. His first business venture began with a marine insurance agency, founded in 1889. In 1895, Wolvin became the president and manager of the Zenith Transportation Company, with the freighter Zenith City marking his first shipbuilding venture that same year. He was appointed general manager of the newly assembled fleet of vessels belonging to the United States Steel Corporation's subsidiary, the Pittsburgh Steamship Company, in 1901. Shortly thereafter, Wolvin founded the Provident Steamship Company in Duluth, commissioning four large vessels for his new venture. (Note: They were named James H. Hoyt, D. G. Kerr, D. M. Clemson, and James H. Reed.)

=== Design and construction ===
James H. Reed was built by the Detroit Shipbuilding Company in Wyandotte, Michigan, as yard number 154. She was named after James Hay Reed, a lawyer and businessman who served as the director of the United States Steel Corporation, and as the president of the Bessemer and Lake Erie Railroad. Although customary to launch lake freighters on Saturdays, James H. Reed was launched at 12:00 on 28 May 1903, a Thursday, without a formal christening ceremony. Her launch was attended by Captain Joseph Kidd, Wolvin's superintendent for shipbuilding, after which she was moved to the Detroit Shipbuilding Company's Orleans Street plant in Detroit, Michigan, where she was completed. James H. Reed and her sister ships, D. G. Kerr and D. M. Clemson, were among the largest vessels on the Great Lakes in 1903, with the other two being built beside each other by the Superior Shipbuilding Company, in West Superior, Wisconsin. At the time of her launching, James H. Reed was the largest freighter ever constructed in Wyandotte.

She was built on the channel system, a longitudinal frame style introduced on the Great Lakes in the mid-1890s. It consisted of several rows of flanged steel plates running the entire length of a vessel's bottom, deriving its name from the "channels" between the frames. This method provided vessels with additional strength, as well as preventing damage sustained in groundings from spreading to other areas of the hull, and increasing cargo capacity. In spite of rapid advances in shipbuilding technology, the hold of James H. Reed remained reminiscent of those found on wooden lake freighters. Between 1882 and 1904, the cargo holds of all iron and steel freighters contained stanchions, vertical columns designed to support their decks; and steel angles which were the equivalent of the knees used on wooden freighters. (Note: It would not be until 1904 that the traditional construction methods were dispensed with in favour of steel arches and sloped side "hopper" tanks, in the freighter Augustus B. Wolvin.)

James H. Reed's 25 hatches, which were longitudinally 9 feet (2.7 m) in depth, were positioned 12 feet (3.7 m) apart, when measured from their centres. (Note: James H. Reed had 26 hatches, when counting the coal bunker hatch.) Her hull contained three watertight bulkheads. The cargo hold was divided into six separate compartments, the first of which was 1,600 long tons (1,626 t) in capacity; the second, third, fourth, and fifth were 1,100 long tons (1,118 t), while the sixth was 1,300 long tons (1,321 t). Her overall capacity was listed as 7,300 long tons (7,417 t).

The hull of James H. Reed had an overall length of 468 feet (142.6 m), a length between perpendiculars of 448 feet (136.6 m), as well as a beam 52 feet (15.8 m) in width. James H. Reed's hull, was 28 feet (8.5 m) in depth. The measurements of her register tonnage were calculated as 5,531 gross register tons and 3,991 net register tons, respectively.

She was powered by a 1,370 ihp (1,020 kW) 90 rpm quadruple expansion steam engine; the cylinders of the engine were 15 inches (38.1 cm), 23.75 inches (60.3 cm), 36.5 inches (92.7 cm) and 56 inches (142.2 cm) in diameter, and had a stroke of 40 inches (101.6 cm). Steam was provided by two water-tube boilers 13 feet 6 inches (4.1 m) in diameter, 12 feet 2 inches (3.7 m) in length, with a working pressure of 250-pound-per-square-inch (1,700 kPa). The boilers were each fitted with four furnaces, accounting for a combined grate surface of 128 square feet (11.9 m^{2}), and a total heating surface of 5,000 square feet (464.5 m^{2}). The engine was manufactured by the shipyard in Detroit, while the boilers were supplied by Babcock & Wilcox of New York City.

=== Service history ===
James H. Reed was the penultimate vessel in the Provident Steamship Company's fleet of four to be completed and enter service, after James H. Hoyt and D. G. Kerr respectively, but before D. M. Clemson. Her US official number was 77589, while her initial port of registry was Duluth. By 1914, it had been changed to Fairport, Ohio.

After completion, James H. Reed proceeded to a coal dock to fuel on 20 April 1903. She departed Detroit on her maiden voyage at 06:10 on 21 July without cargo. She passed Port Huron, Michigan, at 17:40 that same day, and locked up through the Soo Locks at 00:00 on 23 July. She arrived in Duluth on 24 July, and proceeded to load iron ore at the Duluth, Missabe and Iron Range Railway's ore dock.

While docked on the Calumet River in Chicago, Illinois, on 12 November 1903, James H. Reed set a grain haulage record after loading a cargo of 271,000 bushels of wheat at the Peavey grain elevator, amounting to 8,130 long tons (8,260 t). The cargo was the heaviest grain cargo ever carried on the lakes up to that point. She left Chicago for Buffalo on the night of 12 November.

On 9 October 1910, James H. Reed arrived at the Duluth-Superior harbour to load iron ore, departing downbound that same day. At 12:30, she collided head-on with the upbound, coal-laden freighter Martin Mullen in a southern bend of the St Clair River. The crews of both vessels were changing watches at the time of the collision, combined with none of them having retired to their quarters, which prevented any major injuries or fatalities, as speculated by contemporary newspapers. News of the accident was broadcast via the wireless aboard James H. Reed. Both vessels suffered extensive damage to their bows and forecastles, with James H. Reed also losing an anchor. James H. Reed was beached to prevent her from sinking, as her forward compartment was leaking badly. The wrecking tug Favorite, tug Harvey D. Goulder, and lighter Rescue were sent to aid her. Contemporary newspapers reported roughly 1,000 long tons (1,016 t) or ore would need to be jettisoned before temporary repairs could be made. Though the captains of both James H. Reed and Martin Mullen blamed each other for the collision, The Bay City Tribune reported the accident occurred due to a maneuver by the latter, putting her on a collision course with the former. The Detroit Free Press attributed the accident to mistaken passing signals, likely exacerbated by a strong current in the area. James H. Reed later docked at Lorain, Ohio, for repairs. James H. Reed was absorbed into the fleet of the Interlake Steamship Company in 1913.

With the advent of World War II, the demand for iron ore increased dramatically due to the defence effort. James H. Reed was one of many freighters on the Great Lakes to routinely undertake trips early in the shipping season, to increase the maximum amount of iron ore which could be delivered to American steel mills.

=== Final voyage and wreck ===
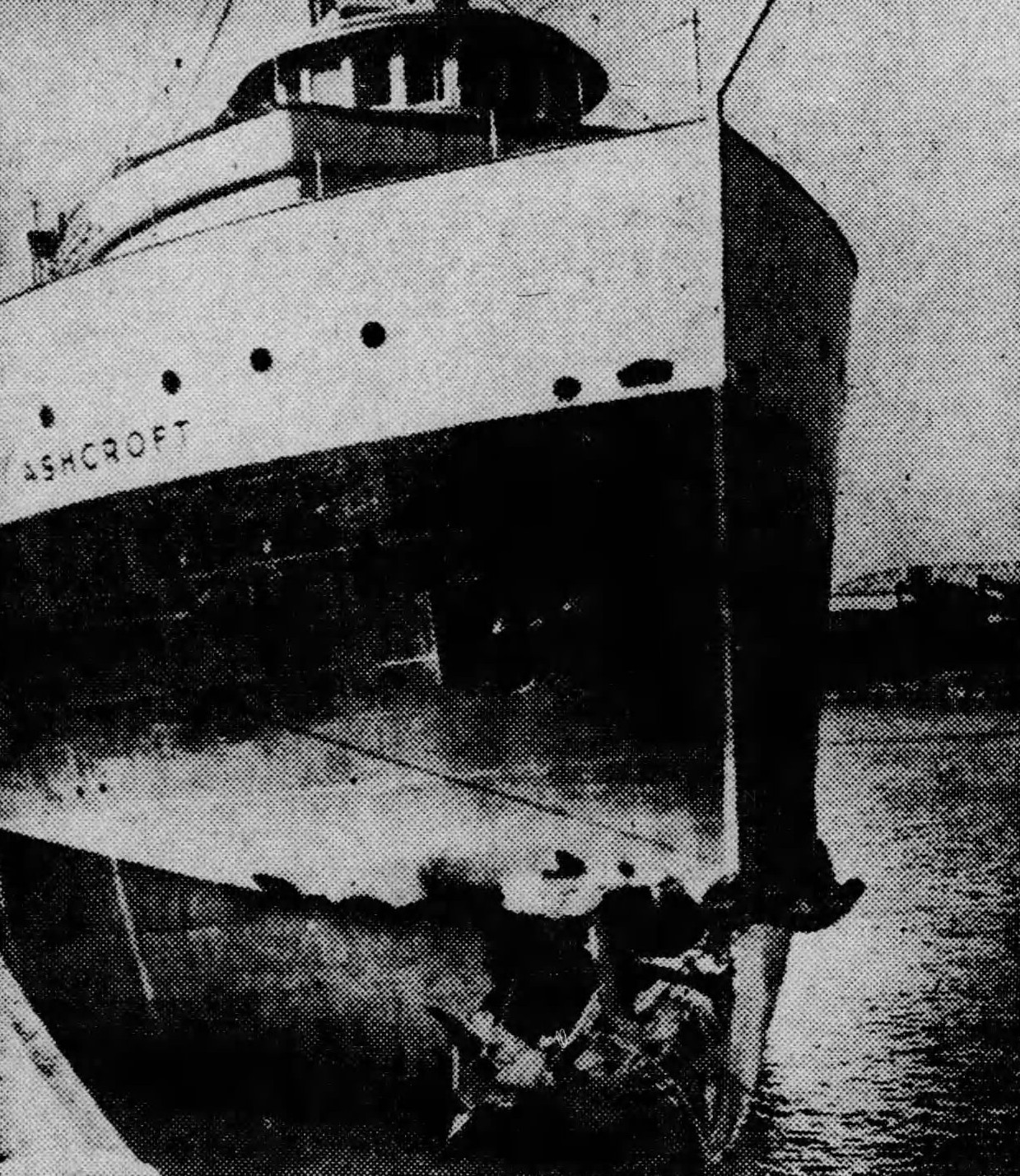
Ashcroft's damaged bow in the aftermath of the collision

On 26 April 1944, as James H. Reed was headed from Escanaba, Michigan, for Buffalo with a cargo of iron ore under the command of Captain Herbert Brightstone, she encountered thick fog over Lake Erie. Despite sounding fog signals, James H. Reed was unexpectedly rammed by the Canadian freighter Ashcroft at 05:30 EST, 42 miles (67.6 km) west of Long Point. James H. Reed was seriously damaged, sinking rapidly, killing 12 of her crew. The 24 survivors were rescued by Ashcroft and a US Coast Guard cutter. The same day James H. Reed sank, the freighter Frank E. Vigor was also lost in a collision on Lake Erie.

Resting in 76 feet (23.2 m) of water near a shipping lane, James H. Reed's wreck was dynamited as a hazard to navigation to within 45 feet (13.7 m) of the lake's surface, in late–November 1944. As a result of the dynamiting, her wreck is disarticulated and scattered over a wide area. She is the largest shipwreck in Lake Erie.

== Sources ==
- "10 Die, 2 Missing in Lake Disaster". Detroit Free Press. 28 April 1944. p. 1 – via Newspapers.com.
- "Accidents to Lake Vessels". The Marine Review. 40 (11). Cleveland: The Marine Review: 466. November 1910 – via Maritime History of the Great Lakes.
- "A Record for Shipbuilding". The Plain Dealer. Cleveland. 27 June 1903. p. 5 – via Newspapers.com.
- "Both Boats Are Badly Damaged". The Plain Dealer. Cleveland. 13 October 1910. p. 13 – via Newspapers.com.
- Bowlus, W. Bruce (2010). Iron Ore Transport on the Great Lakes: The Development of a Delivery System to Feed American Industry. Jefferson, North Carolina: McFarland & Company, Inc. ISBN 978-0-786433-26-1.
- Bugbee, Gordon P. (February 1962a). "Iron Merchant Ships: An Upper Lakes Centennial - Part One" (PDF). Telescope. 11 (2). Detroit, Michigan: Great Lakes Maritime Institute: 24–27 – via Maritime History of the Great Lakes.
- Bugbee, Gordon P. (March 1962b). "Iron Merchant Ships: An Upper Lakes Cenntenial – Part Two" (PDF). Telescope. 11 (3). Detroit, Michigan: Great Lakes Maritime Institute: 46–51 – via Maritime History of the Great Lakes.
- "Channel System of Ship Construction". The Marine Review. 11 (18). Cleveland: The Marine Review: 6. 2 May 1895 – via Maritime History of the Great Lakes.
- "Channel System of Construction". The Marine Review. 12 (12). Cleveland: 13–22. 12 September 1895 – via Maritime History of the Great Lakes.
- "Choctaw Shipwreck Site National Register of Historic Places Registration Form" (PDF). Washington D.C.: National Park Service. 2018. Archived from the original (PDF) on 1 January 2019.
- "Clemson Takes Immense Cargo". The Duluth News Tribune. 21 November 1903. p. 8 – via Newspapers.com.
- "Detroit Built Boat Makes a New Record". Detroit Free Press. 13 November 1903. p. 10 – via Newspapers.com.
- "Duluth–Superior Harbor". The Duluth News Tribune. 9 October 1910. p. 9 – via Newspapers.com.
- Green, Fred W. (1912). "Mitchell & Co.'s Marine Directory of the Great Lakes – 1912". Cleveland, Ohio: Bureau Veritas – via Maritime History of the Great Lakes.
- Herriman, H. N. (1905). "Great Lakes Register – For the Construction and Classification of Steel and Wooden Vessels – 1905". Chicago, Illinois: Lakeside Press – via Maritime History of the Great Lakes.
- Herriman, H. N. (1914). "Great Lakes Register – For the Construction and Classification of Steel and Wooden Vessels – 1914". Chicago, Illinois: Lakeside Press – via Maritime History of the Great Lakes.
- "James H. Reed". Columbus, Ohio: Ohio State University.
- Kohl, Cris (2008) [2001]. The Great Lakes Diving Guide. West Chicago, Illinois: Seawolf Communications. ISBN 978-0-967997-69-8.
- "Largest Built at Wyandotte". Detroit Free Press. 29 May 1903. p. 9 – via Newspapers.com.
- "Launch Three Wolvin Boats". Detroit Free Press. 26 June 1903. p. 9 – via Newspapers.com.
- "Look Out for Records - New Steamer Reed is Liable to Break Many of Them". Detroit Free Press. 14 June 1903. p. 11 – via Newspapers.com.
- "Marine News – Port Huron". The Daily Herald. Port Huron, Michigan. 22 July 1903. p. 5 – via Newspapers.com.
- Miller, Al (2002). "Teeming With Enterprise – Augustus B. Wolvin's Life on the Great Lakes". Inland Seas. 58 (1). Toledo, Ohio: Great Lakes Historical Society: 7–27 – via National Museum of the Great Lakes.
- "New Cummings Boat at Wyandotte is Being Rushed". Detroit Free Press. 8 June 1903. p. 3 – via Newspapers.com.
- "Reed, James H." Bowling Green, Ohio: Bowling Green State University. Archived from the original on 16 November 2025 – via Historical Collections of the Great Lakes.
- "Reed's First Trip". Detroit Free Press. 21 July 1903. p. 9 – via Newspapers.com.
- "Ship of the Month No. 168: Saskadoc". The Scanner. 21 (2). Toronto, Ontario: Toronto Marine Historical Society: 7–11. 1988 – via Maritime History of the Great Lakes.
- "Soo Canal". Detroit Free Press. 24 July 1903. p. 3 – via Newspapers.com.
- "Steamer Reed's Maiden Trip". The Duluth News Tribune. 22 July 1903. p. 8 – via Newspapers.com.
- "Steel Boats Hit; Both Crews Safe". The Bay City Tribune. Bay City, Michigan. 13 October 1910. p. 2 – via Newspapers.com.
- Stonehouse, Frederick (1990) [1984]. Went Missing, II. Au Train, Michigan: Avery Color Studios. ISBN 978-0-932212-37-5.
- Thompson, Mark L. (1994). Queen of the Lakes. Detroit, Michigan: Wayne State University Press. ISBN 0-8143-2393-6.
- "Two Freighters Badly Damaged in Collision". Buffalo Courier. 13 October 1910. p. 2 – via Newspapers.com.
- "Two New Boats to Be Launched". The Duluth News Tribune. 2 July 1903. p. 8 – via Newspapers.com.
- "Two Records Smashed - Provident Boats Hold Banner For Big Cargoes". Detroit Free Press. 22 November 1903. p. 10 – via Newspapers.com.
- "Vessels Crash Above the Flats". Detroit Free Press. 13 October 1910. p. 14 – via Newspapers.com.
- "Vessel Passages – Detroit". Detroit Free Press. 22 July 1903. p. 9 – via Newspapers.com.
- Wicklund, Richard H. (1977). "Largest Lakers Lost – 1913-1975". Telescope. 26 (5). Detroit, Michigan: Great Lakes Maritime Institute: 115–120.
