= SS D. M. Clemson (1903) =

American lake freighter (1903–1908)

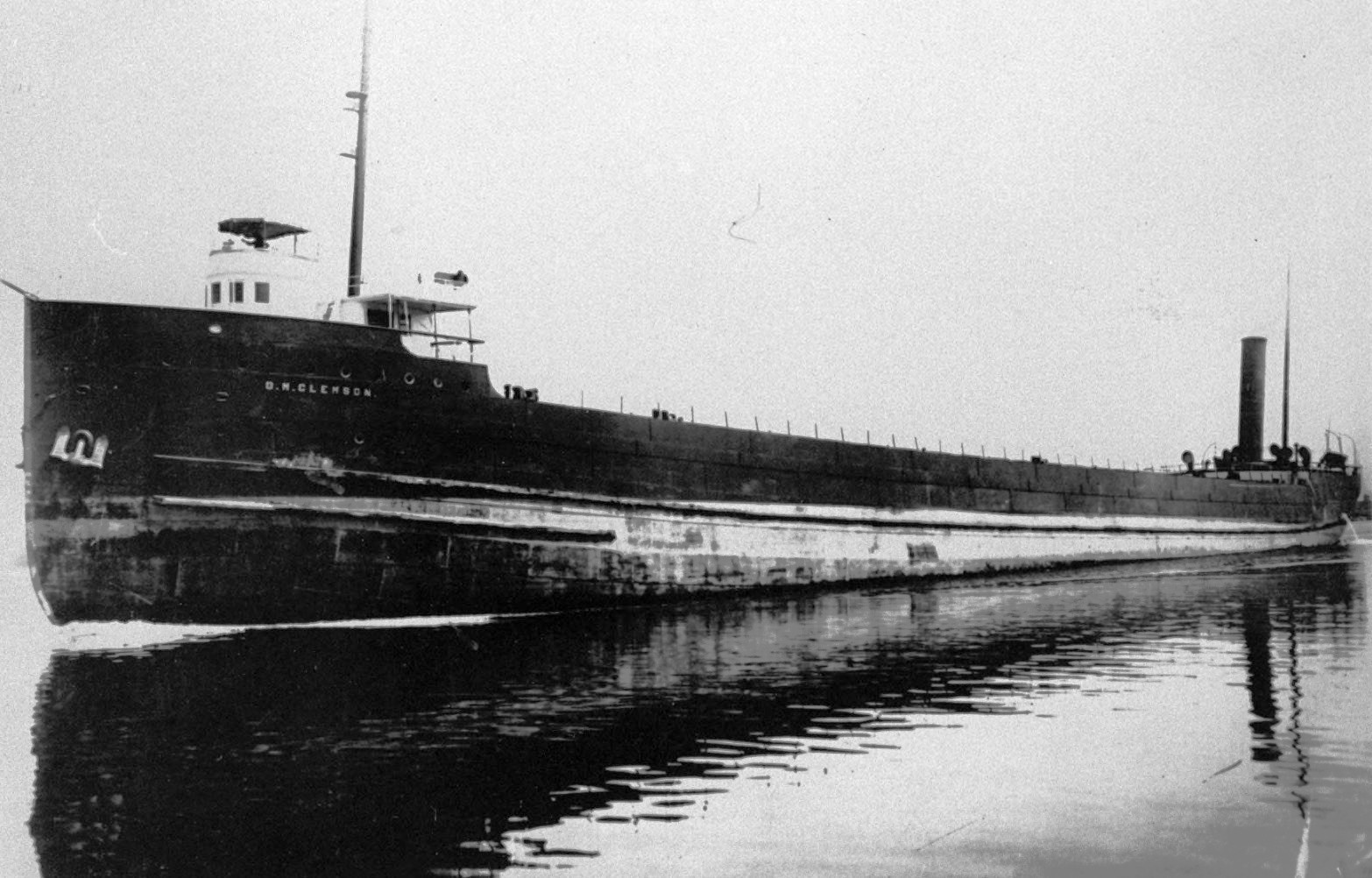

History

United States
- Name: D. M. Clemson
- Namesake: Daniel M. Clemson
- Operator: Provident Steamship Company
- Port of registry: Duluth, Minnesota
- Ordered: 22 July 1902
- Builder: Superior Shipbuilding Company
- Cost: $315,000 ($9.05 million in 2025) (Note: One source listed the cost as $350,000 (equivalent to $10.1 million in 2025). (Note: Johnston, Louis & Williamson, Samuel H. (2023). "What Was the U.S. GDP Then?". MeasuringWorth. United States Gross Domestic Product deflator figures follow the MeasuringWorth series.))
- Yard number: 510
- Launched: 3 July 1903
- Maiden voyage: 13 August 1903
- Out of service: 30 November 1908 (Note: The date of the storm that sank D. M. Clemson was also reported as 1 December.)
- Identification: US official number 157703
- Fate: Sank in a storm on Lake Superior

General characteristics
- Class & type: Lake freighter
- Sister ship(s): D. G. Kerr; James H. Reed
- Tonnage: 5,531 GRT; 3,991 NRT
- Tons burthen: 17,000
- Length: 468 feet (142.6 m) o/a; 448 feet (136.6 m) p/p
- Beam: 52 feet (15.8 m)
- Depth: 28 feet (8.5 m)
- Installed power: Engine: 1 × 90 rpm 1,370 ihp (1,020 kW) quadruple expansion steam engine (Note: Some sources list the engine's power as 1,800 ihp (1,300 kW).); Boilers: 2 × 250 pounds per square inch (1,700 kPa) water-tube boilers
- Propulsion: 1 × propeller
- Speed: 12 knots (13.8 mph)
- Capacity: 7,800 long tons (7,925 t) (Note: Some sources list D. M. Clemson's cargo capacity as 7,500 long tons (7,620 t), 7,000 long tons (7,112 t), or 6,900 long tons (7,011 t) on an 18-foot (5.5 m) draught.)
- Crew: 24

SS D. M. Clemson was an American lake freighter active on the Great Lakes between 1903 and 1908. She was built by the Superior Shipbuilding Company in West Superior, Wisconsin, for the Provident Steamship Company of Duluth, Minnesota, managed by Augustus B. Wolvin. She carried iron ore, coal, and grain, breaking several cargo records. She was involved in a number of serious accidents, including nearly sinking in a storm on Lake Superior in September 1905, and a collision with the piers of the Ashtabula Harbor Light just a few weeks prior to her loss.

On the morning of 30 November 1908, D. M. Clemson passed through the Soo Locks into Lake Superior with a cargo of coal loaded two days prior in Lorain, Ohio, which was bound for Duluth. Her captain, Samuel R. Chamberlain, was scheduled to retire at the end of her voyage. Chamberlain elected to take his vessel on the southernmost route to Duluth, which required passage through the Portage Canal. Shortly after passing Whitefish Point, an unusually powerful snowstorm descended on Lake Superior, sinking D. M. Clemson and killing her entire complement of 24.

Within a few days, wreckage was discovered floating in Lake Superior and on its shores, though they were initially believed to be from a different freighter. Following the discovery of several pieces of wreckage bearing a legible name and the confirmation she was the only missing vessel on the lake, D. M. Clemson was conclusively identified as the source. Contemporary sources speculated she was lost shortly after entering the storm. Her loss has been attributed to several different phenomena, including structural or mechanical failure or the loss of her hatch covers.

Despite repeated searches by the Great Lakes Shipwreck Historical Society, the wreck of D. M. Clemson has never been found. She is the largest undiscovered shipwreck on the Great Lakes.

== History ==
=== Background ===
Following the success of the first regionally produced iron–hulled merchant vessel, Merchant, built in 1862, shipyards around the Great Lakes began to construct iron ships on a relatively large scale. However, wooden–hulled vessels continued to dominate shipping on the Great Lakes until the 1880s.

The first steel freighters on the Great Lakes were completed in 1884, with metal becoming a common material used in the construction of new hulls by the 1890s. Rapidly decreasing steel prices, the development of the pneumatic rivet gun, and advancements in the gantry crane boosted shipyard productivity, contributing to the rapid increase in the size of lake freighters in the late 19th and early 20th centuries.

Throughout the 1880s, the iron ore trade on the Great Lakes grew quickly, primarily because lake freighters were becoming larger and making more trips to the ore docks of Lake Superior. With the railways unable to keep up with the rapid extraction of iron ore, bulk freighters became an integral component in the region's iron ore industry. By 1890, 57% of the 16,000,000 long tons (16,256,751 t) of the iron ore produced by mines in the United States came from the region surrounding Lake Superior.

Augustus B. Wolvin was a prominent businessman within the Great Lakes shipping industry, based in Duluth, Minnesota. His first business venture was a marine insurance agency, founded in 1889. In 1895, Wolvin became the president and manager of the Zenith Transportation Company, with the freighter Zenith City marking his first shipbuilding venture that same year. He was appointed general manager of the newly assembled fleet of vessels belonging to the Pittsburgh Steamship Company, a subsidiary of the United States Steel Corporation, in 1901. Shortly thereafter, Wolvin founded the Provident Steamship Company in Duluth, commissioning four large vessels for his new venture. (Note: They were named James H. Hoyt, D. G. Kerr, D. M. Clemson, and James H. Reed.) The contract for two of the vessels was awarded to the American Ship Building Company's yard in West Superior, Wisconsin, on 22 July 1902, following the completion of James H. Hoyt.

=== Design and construction ===
D. M. Clemson was built by the Superior Shipbuilding Company in West Superior, as yard number 510, at a cost of $315,000 (equivalent to $9.05 million in 2025). She and her sister ships, D. G. Kerr and James H. Reed, were among the largest vessels on the Great Lakes in 1903, with D. G. Kerr being built alongside D. M. Clemson in West Superior. A contemporary report by The Duluth News Tribune lauded D. M. Clemson's size, referring to her as a "[m]onster freighter". Maritime historian Frederick Stonehouse describes her as "[r]epresenting the highest state of the shipbuilders' art".

The hull of D. M. Clemson had an overall length of 468 feet (142.6 m), a length between perpendiculars of 448 feet (136.6 m), a beam of 52 feet (15.8 m), and was 28 feet (8.5 m) in depth. She measured 5,531 gross register tons and 3,991 net register tons. Additionally, she was listed as 17,000 tons burthen. She was built on the channel system, a longitudinal frame style introduced on the Great Lakes in the mid-1890s. It consisted of several rows of flanged steel plates running the entire length of a vessel's bottom, deriving its name from the "channels" between the frames. This method provided vessels with additional strength, as well as preventing damage sustained in groundings from spreading to other areas of the hull and increasing cargo capacity. In spite of rapid advances in shipbuilding technology, the hold of D. M. Clemson remained reminiscent of those found on wooden lake freighters. Between 1882 and 1904, the cargo holds of all iron and steel freighters contained stanchions, vertical columns designed to support their decks, and steel angles, which were the equivalent of the knees used on wooden freighters. (Note: It would not be until 1904 that the traditional construction methods were dispensed with in favour of steel arches and sloped side "hopper" tanks, in the freighter Augustus B. Wolvin.) D. M. Clemson's 25 hatches, which were longitudinally (from bow to stern) 9 feet (2.7 m) in depth, were positioned 12 feet (3.7 m) apart when measured from their centres. Her hull contained three watertight bulkheads. The cargo hold was divided into six compartments, the first of which was 1,600 long tons (1,626 t) in capacity; the second, third, fourth, and fifth were 1,100 long tons (1,118 t), while the sixth was 1,300 long tons (1,321 t). Her overall capacity was listed as 7,800 long tons (7,925 t). (Note: Cargo hold figures taken from measurements of D. G. Kerr, D. M. Clemson's identical sister ship.) She was flush-decked, with no aft deckhouse, so her crew's accommodations were located below decks.

She was powered by a 90 rpm 1,370 ihp (1,020 kW) quadruple expansion steam engine; the four cylinders of the engine were 15 inches (38.1 cm), 23.75 inches (60.3 cm), 36.5 inches (92.7 cm), and 56 inches (142.2 cm) in diameter, and had a stroke of 40 inches (101.6 cm). (Note: The engine's first cylinder was high pressure, the second and third intermediate, and the fourth low.) Steam was provided by two water-tube boilers 13 feet 6 inches (4.1 m) in diameter, 12 feet 2 inches (3.7 m) in length, with a working pressure of 250-pound-per-square-inch (1,700 kPa). The boilers were each fitted with four furnaces, accounting for a combined grate surface of 128 square feet (11.9 m^{2}), and a total heating surface of 5,000 square feet (464.5 m^{2}). The engine was manufactured by the shipyard in West Superior, while the boilers were supplied by Babcock & Wilcox of New York City. D. M. Clemson's machinery enabled her to reach 12 knots (13.8 mph).

==== Name and launching ====
She was named after Daniel M. Clemson, the president of the Pittsburgh Steamship Company, although her prospective name was erroneously reported by the Detroit Free Press as D. K. Clemson. Local newspapers originally reported a launch date of 1 June, which was later revised to 27 June, and advertised a substantial christening gala, though the event would experience delays. Although lake freighters were customarily launched on Saturdays, D. M. Clemson was launched on a Friday, between 16:00 and 16:30 on 3 July 1903, without a formal christening ceremony, at the behest of Wolvin. Bad weather caused low attendance.

=== Service history ===
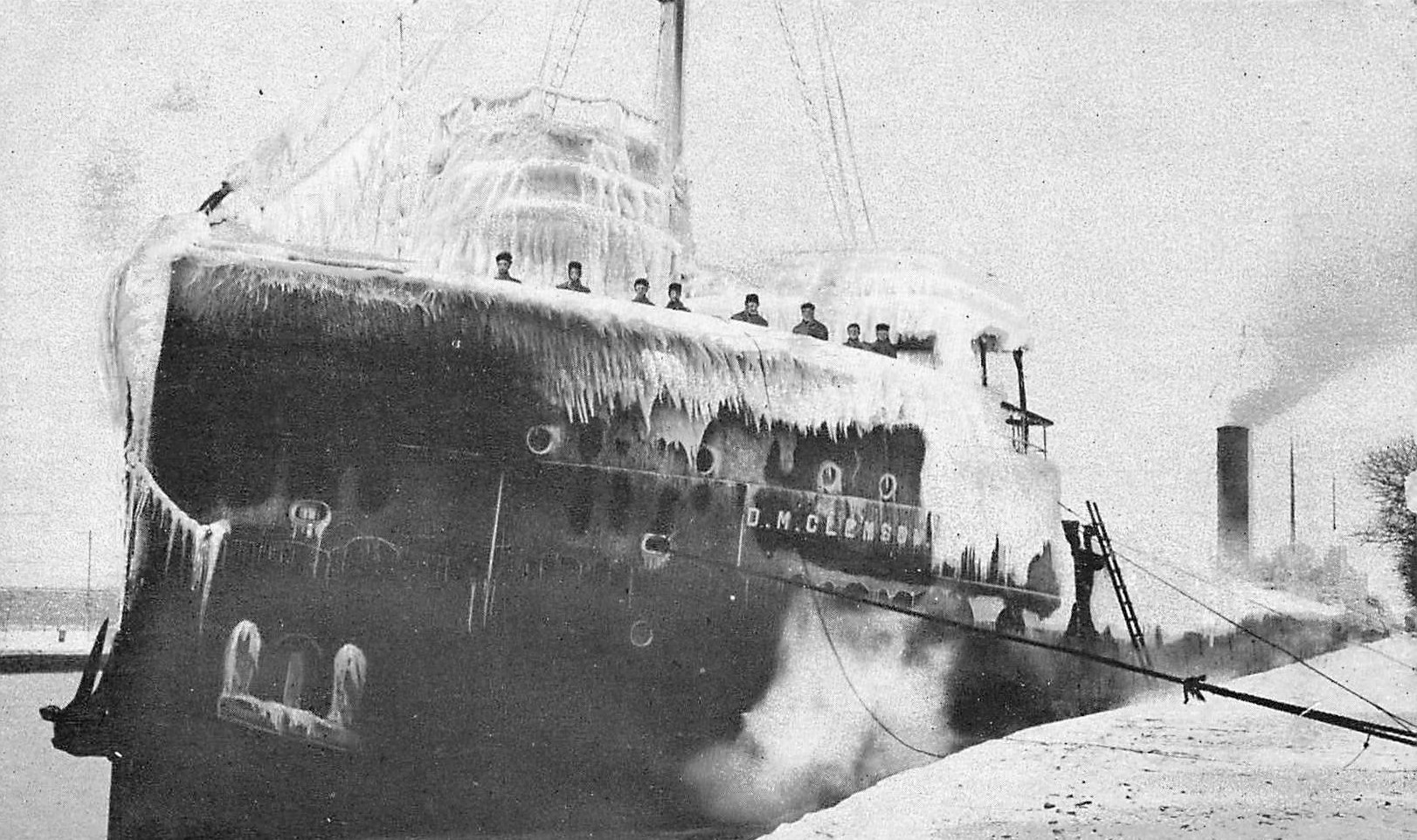
D. M. Clemson in the Soo Locks

D. M. Clemson was the final vessel in the Provident Steamship Company's fleet of four to be completed and enter service, following James H. Hoyt, D. G. Kerr, and James H. Reed. Her US official number was 157703, and her port of registry was Duluth.

On 13 August 1903, D. M. Clemson began her maiden voyage for Lake Erie under the command of Captain Frank Rae, after loading 7,725 long tons (7,849 t) of iron ore at the Duluth, Missabe and Iron Range Railway's ore dock in Duluth, beating the previous haulage record set by the freighter William Edenborn. (Note: One source listed 7,775 long tons (7,900 t) of iron ore.) The cargo gave her a draught of 18 feet 9 inches (571.5 cm). She locked down through the Soo Locks on 16 August, at 12:20, and passed Detroit, Michigan, on 18 August, at 09:00. D. M. Clemson arrived in Conneaut, Ohio, on 20 August. Rae became involved in a labour dispute in September, because he refused to join the Masters' & Pilots' Association and employed his father, another non-union member, as a mate. His actions resulted in a widespread strike, which saw multiple vessels of the Pittsburgh Steamship Company idling in port. He was relieved of command in October.

While attempting to enter Conneaut on 26 October 1903, D. M. Clemson ran aground on a mud bar at the harbour entrance. Contemporary accounts attributed the bar's formation to the removal of the harbour's piers in preparation for their replacement. After a considerable effort, she was removed ten hours after grounding, with the bar being dredged shortly thereafter. On 20 November 1903, she took on 336,365 bushels of barley destined for Buffalo, at Duluth's Cargill Commission. Weighing 8,072 long tons (8,202 t), it set a new record for the largest cargo of grain loaded at a port on Lake Superior. The grain cargo was the largest in terms of bushel amount on the lakes overall and the second heaviest up to that point, behind a consignment of wheat loaded eight days earlier by James H. Reed.

D. M. Clemson broke the record for a coal cargo with an 8,200 long tons (8,332 t) load of bituminous coal, which she discharged at Duluth on 22 June 1904. She broke another record a month later, on 22 July, after loading 8,441 long tons (8,576 t) and 1,750 pounds (793.8 kg) of soft coal destined for Superior, Wisconsin, at the Hocking dock in Toledo, Ohio, the largest cargo of that type loaded at the port. (Note: One source listed the weight of the cargo as 8,000 long tons (8,128 t).) She stranded in the Menominee River on 12 August 1904, while laden with anthracite coal, receiving no damage. She was freed the following night, after 350 long tons (356 t) of the cargo was removed.

In September 1905, D. M. Clemson almost sank. At 02:00 on 2 September, she left Duluth, laden with iron ore bound for South Chicago, Illinois. As she proceeded across Lake Superior, weather conditions began to deteriorate. She eventually encountered the full force of a storm, described by The Cleveland Leader as "unsurpassed". Waves swept over her decks, smashing in two of the hatch covers and entering her hold, which caused her cargo to shift. Captain Samuel R. Chamberlain decided to turn her around, arriving in Two Harbors, Minnesota, several hours later with a 4-foot (1.2 m) list to starboard, and little freeboard. In addition to the broken hatches, she also lost several railings and sustained other damage. In mid-September 1905, D. M. Clemson was placed in dry dock in Superior to repair damage to her bottom caused by ice earlier that year. Repairs were not deemed to be of the utmost importance, leading to their delay. Thirteen of her plates were replaced. Drawing 19 feet (5.8 m) of water, D. M. Clemson ran aground opposite the Minnesota ore docks in the Buffalo River due to low water levels on 26 September 1905, while underway to unload her cargo of iron ore. Although the tug Delta succeeded in freeing her, she grounded again while turning around. The wrecking tug Saginaw was dispatched to assist, but failed to free her. On the morning of 27 September, increased water levels allowed her to float free, and subsequently unload her cargo at the ore dock.

While upbound with coal on 13 April 1906, D. M. Clemson ran aground on Bar Point on Lake Erie, remaining there for several hours. She was eventually freed and allowed to continue her journey, having sustained no visible damage.

At 07:00 on 20 June 1907, while downbound and laden with iron ore, D. M. Clemson collided with the upbound whaleback James B. Neilson in heavy fog off Middle Island on Lake Huron. D. M. Clemson was struck on her port side, immediately forward of her coal bunkers. Despite receiving considerable damage, she proceeded on her way, her captain reporting the collision at Port Huron, Michigan, at 22:15 later that day.

On the night of 20 October 1908, D. M. Clemson was bound from Conneaut for Ashtabula, Ohio, to load coal. While attempting to enter the latter port, a strong current drove her against the pier of the Ashtabula Harbor Light, damaging ten hull plates above the turn of her bilge, as well as the first water tank on her starboard side. Her impact with the pier knocked it 4 inches (10.2 cm) out of line. As the damage sustained was concentrated above the waterline, D. M. Clemson received temporary repairs in Astabula, before leaving on a voyage for Lake Superior. On 24 October, while upbound with coal, she ran aground on Point Pelee, due to smoke from a forest fire obscuring visibility. She was freed later that day, continuing her voyage, receiving no noticeable damage.

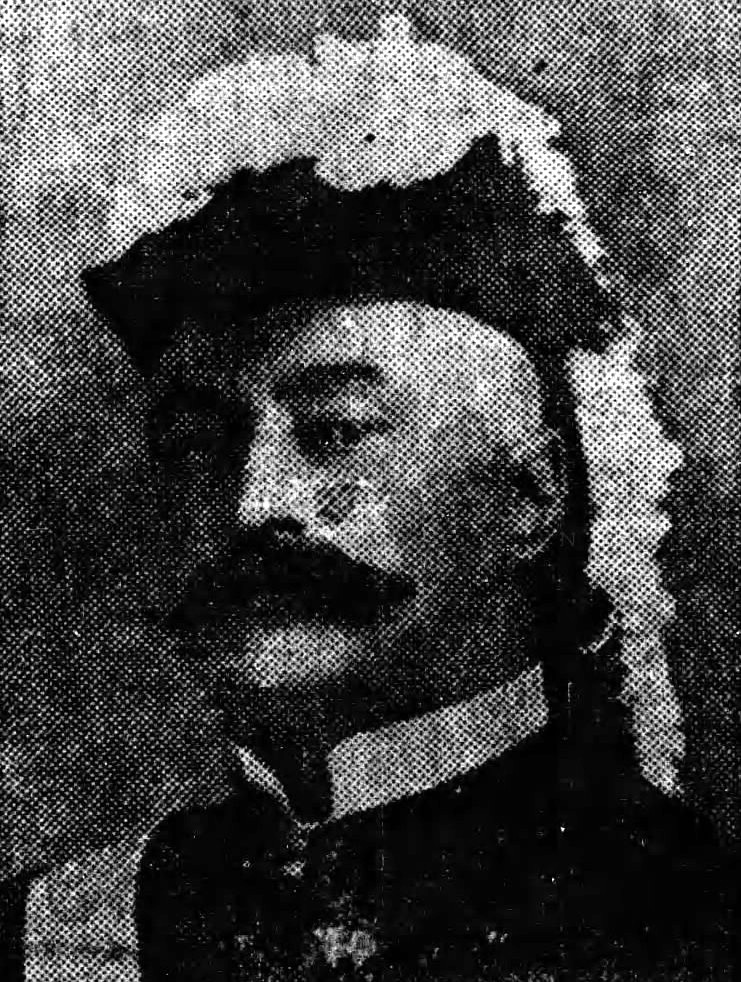
Samuel R. Chamberlain

After loading 8,000 long tons (8,128 t) of iron ore consigned to Ashtabula in Duluth on 20 November 1908, D. M. Clemson encountered a fierce storm on Lake Superior. (Note: One source listed her departure point as Two Harbors.) A following sea broke over her stern, flooding the crew's aft quarters, smashing the engine room skylights, and buckling cabin doors. Chamberlain altered course to avoid flooding her engine. The following morning, green seas, combined with a sharp drop in temperature, resulted in a thick layer of ice coating D. M. Clemson's decks. She struggled against the storm for two days, until it dissipated, allowing her to continue her journey to the Soo Locks. Despite the severity of the storm, she sustained no obvious structural damage. Her crew repaired the damaged fittings. Albeit delayed, she arrived in Ashtabula on 24 November and unloaded her cargo.

=== Final voyage ===
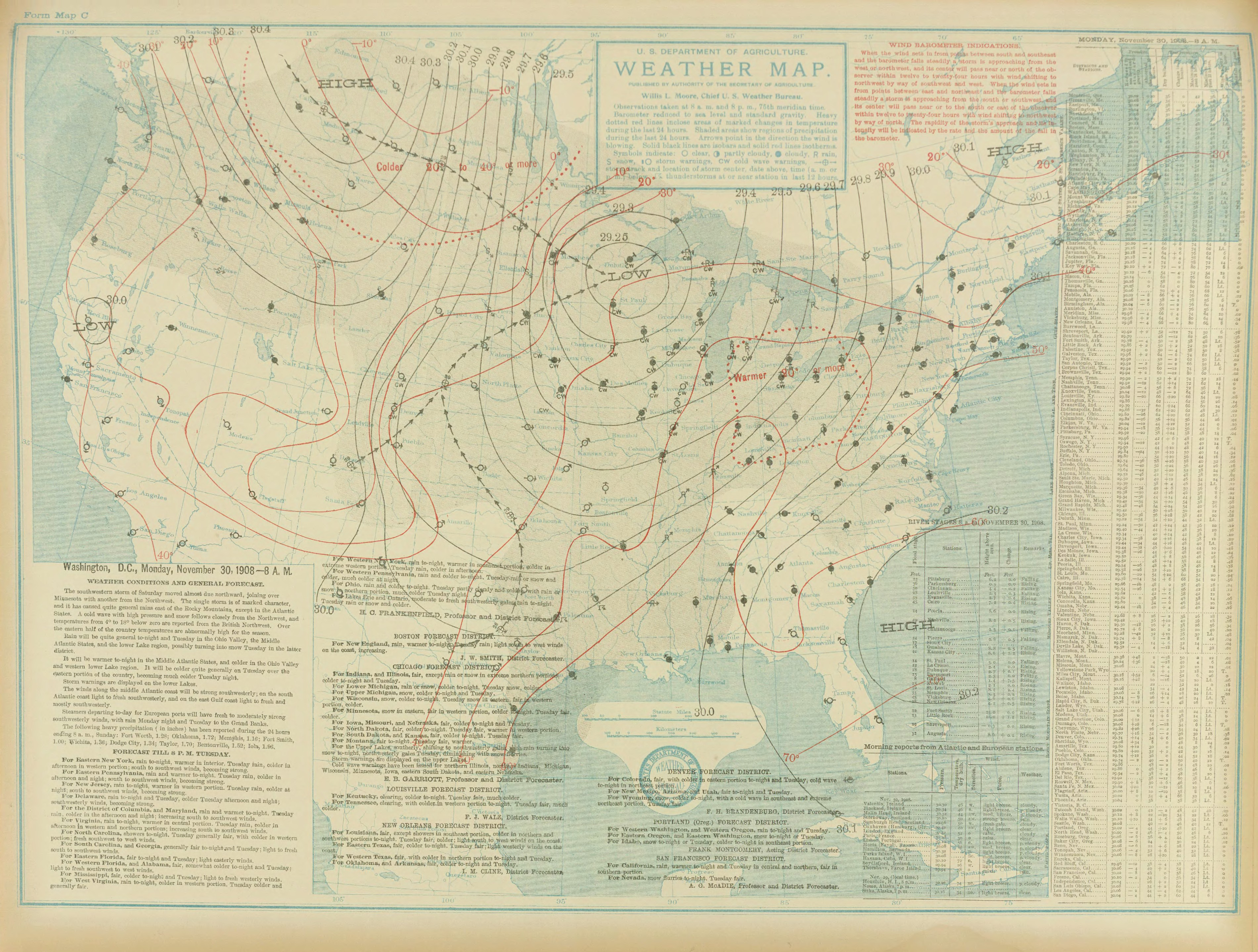
Weather map for 30 November 1908

In the evening on 27 November, D. M. Clemson departed Ashtabula, arriving in Lorain, Ohio, later that same day. As two deckhands had quit their positions upon arriving in Lorain, two local men were hurriedly hired as replacements.

D. M. Clemson departed Lorain on 28 November, with a cargo of coal destined for Duluth, where she was to be laid up upon the completion of her voyage. Chamberlain, who was scheduled to retire at the end of the shipping season, was in command. D. M. Clemson passed Detroit at 16:45 that same day. She locked up into Lake Superior on the Canadian side of the Soo Locks at 09:30 on 30 November, and was scheduled to arrive in Duluth later that night. (Note: The Detroit Free Press estimated her day of arrival as 1 December.) She left the locks in the company of the freighter J. J. H. Brown, sailing northwest across Whitefish Bay. The vessels parted ways near Whitefish Point, with Chamberlain electing to take the south shore route to Duluth, which required passage through the Portage Canal. J. J. H. Brown altered course to the north, a route which offered better protection against heavy weather. Shortly thereafter, a powerful snowstorm with 50 to 65 miles per hour (80.5 to 104.6 km/h) winds swept Lake Superior. Captain Frank D. Chamberlain of J. J. H. Brown, whose vessel was struck by the storm approximately 75 miles (120.7 km) after leaving D. M. Clemson, described the storm to The Duluth News Tribune.

It was the worst gale I ever went into. Every swell would seem ready to swamp us. Time after time the swells would break completely over the boat. Tuesday I had to shut down my engines and we drifted for 12 hours. After the gale blew itself out there was heavy snowfall and it was impossible to see any distance ahead.

An unconfirmed sighting of D. M. Clemson was reported by the captain of the Algoma Central Steamship Company freighter Paliki, who claimed to have spotted her in heavy snow, west of Whitefish Point. This sighting would have been the final time she was seen afloat. Paliki's captain estimated that D. M. Clemson would have passed Vermilion Point three to four hours after their purported encounter, around the time the snowfall intensified dramatically. (Note: Some sources referred to the vessel as Palika, while the Alpena County George N. Fletcher Public Library confirms her name as Paliki.)

==== Aftermath ====
The crews of the turret deck ship Turret Court and the package freighter Wasaga reported sighting a pilothouse and several hatch covers floating off Crisp Point on 4 December. Several other vessels encountered floating wreckage in the vicinity of Crisp Point that same day, including the canaller Algonquin, lumber hooker C. F. Curtis, and freighter Thomas Barlum, the latter reporting passing through a field of mahogany debris. The crew of the freighter J. H. Bartow also reported spotting several floating life jackets.

Initially, the debris was linked to the wooden freighter Tampa, which had been reported overdue in Fort William, Ontario. The hatch covers discovered were painted red, matching those of Tampa. Tampa also had mahogany furnishings, corresponding to the wreckage discovered by Thomas Barlum. Downbound vessels were questioned in an effort to identify the wreckage. However, Tampa arrived in Fort William at 14:30 on 5 December, without any apparent damage, after sheltering behind the Keweenaw Peninsula throughout the four-day storm.

Despite growing concern among mariners, search parties only arrived on the scene several days after D. M. Clemson's last sighting. Wolvin maintained that she was safe and sheltering behind Grand Island. However, the vessel in the lee of Grand Island was identified as the freighter D. O. Mills. Around a week after D. M. Clemson's final sighting, the tugs Sabine and Schenck were dispatched from the Soo Locks. Schenck searched the area around Whitefish Point, while Sabine travelled along the south shore to Grand Marais, Michigan, then to Michipicoten Island, before returning to the Soo. The tugs James Whalen and H. F. Bowman patrolled the Canadian shore between Thunder Bay and Michipicoten Island. The tug Harrison, based out of Duluth, scouted the area between Isle Royale, the Keweenaw Peninsula, and Stannard Rock. Only Schenck was able to find debris, which consisted of two hatch covers. On 6 December, lifesavers recovered 23 hatch covers on the beach near the Two Hearted River.

On 7 December, the freighter Dundee passed through a floating debris field, identified by her captain as coming from D. M. Clemson. By 8 December, 30 hatch covers had been recovered between Crisp Point and Vermilion Point. That same day, the freighter William H. Gratwick, towing the barge No. 86, reported sighting several pieces of floating wreckage, which appeared to be hatch covers. By 9 December, the entire shoreline between Grand Marais and Whitefish Point had become littered with debris, including parts of D. M. Clemson's cabin, discovered ashore near Grand Marais. At 22:30 on 9 December, the freighter Frank T. Heffelfinger returned to Duluth after patrolling the lake around Caribou Island, as well as areas around Michipicoten Island and Isle Royale, without finding any trace of D. M. Clemson.

D. M. Clemson's loss was substantiated on 10 December, when a search party discovered a cork life jacket and a water barrel in the vicinity of Crisp Point, both stencilled with her name. Joseph S. Hayes, the superintendent of the Provident Steamship Company, who had arrived in Grand Marais two days earlier to organise the search parties, confirmed the identity of the wreckage. Frederick B. Wells, another Wolvin-owned freighter, recovered two further hatch covers on 12 December. The hatches of Frederick B. Wells and D. M. Clemson were identical in size, further verifying the identity of the lost vessel. Other debris, including a red pail rack, were recovered. One piece of wreckage bore signs of an explosion.

The first body from D. M. Clemson's complement of 24 was discovered by a member of the lifesaving service on the shores of Crisp Point. Although the lifesaver attempted to recover the body, the rope attached to the life jacket snapped, and the body sank into the lake. By 17 December, lifesavers at Crisp Point had recovered a body, identified as Second Mate Charles Woods of Marine City, Michigan. Reports of two further bodies in the surf proved false. On 29 December, a body recovered earlier at Crisp Point was identified as watchman Simon Dunn of Dublin, Ireland. (Note: Also reported as Cyrus Dunn.)

The sinking of D. M. Clemson was the worst financial loss on the Great Lakes in 1908, constituting nearly half the year's total property loss. (Note: Sixteen vessels were lost on the Great Lakes in 1908, amounting to a financial loss of $631,000 ($15.9 million in 2025).) She was valued at $300,000 ($7.57 million in 2025), while her cargo was worth $12,000 ($302,888 in 2025). Both were insured. (Note: Wolff reports the monetary loss in the wake of D. M. Clemson's sinking as $330,000 ($8.33 million in 2025).) She was the only vessel lost in a storm on the Great Lakes that year.

A badly decomposed body, assumed by contemporary reports to be from D. M. Clemson, was recovered on the southeast side of Ile Parisienne in May 1909. On 21 May that year, the crew of the steamer Caribou recovered part of an oar bearing D. M. Clemson's name on its blade, in Batchawana Bay. They also witnessed a door and two oil barrels ashore in the bay, which they assumed originated from D. M. Clemson.

On 1 September 1909, a bottle containing a message purportedly from D. M. Clemson was discovered floating in Superior Bay, around 300 miles (482.8 km) from Crisp Point. The note, seemingly written on a page torn from a notebook and stained by an unidentified chemical, read "boat gone down 7:30. Clemson, Captain Chamberland and crew". The note was tentatively dismissed as a hoax by contemporary newspapers due to the misspelling of both Chamberlain's name and that of D. M. Clemson, the ship's name having been scratched out, and then written correctly.

The detached pilothouse, still bearing D. M. Clemson's nameplate, drifted ashore 3 miles (4.8 km) west of Whitefish Point. It was salvaged and remained on the property of a local man until the 1930s.

==== Theories ====
The definitive cause of D. M. Clemson's sinking remains a mystery and has been the subject of much speculation. A report by the Detroit Free Press on 9 December 1908 speculated that waves had loosened her hatch covers, causing water to enter the hold. Two days later, the The Duluth News Tribune suggested that she sank shortly after entering the storm, and proposes her owners' theory that her engine or rudder had failed. The possibility of D. M. Clemson breaking in two was also hypothesised.

Julius F. Wolff Jr., a political science professor at the University of Minnesota Duluth, covered the loss of D. M. Clemson in a 1972 issue of Inland Seas. He proposed several possible causes: falling into the trough between waves and capsizing, the temporary repairs to her hull failing, her hatch covers possibly blowing, a boiler explosion, or the grounding at Point Pelee potentially damaging her hull enough for it to break in two under the strain of the storm.

In his 1984 book Went Missing, maritime historian Frederick Stonehouse theorized that damage incurred from her collision with the Ashtabula lighthouse pier, compounded by her grounding on Point Pelee, caused the ship to break in two and sink rapidly. Stonehouse posited that stress sustained during the storm, in combination with her temporary repairs, made her particularly vulnerable to hull failure.

Historian James Donahue, writing for The Times Herald in 1989, ascribes her loss to either the failure of her hatch covers or catastrophic structural failure, namely breaking in two. He speculates that the rush of air caused by the rapid sinking blew the hatch covers free, and attributes the lack of bodies recovered in the aftermath to a rapid sinking, trapping most of the crew below decks.

In November 1911, D. M. Clemson's sister ship, D. G. Kerr, almost sank in a storm on Lake Superior. She encountered 60 miles per hour (96.6 km/h) winds and large waves, and gradually accumulated large quantities of ice on her decks. Eventually, the weight of the ice snapped the whistle and its steam pipe, allowing steam to escape rapidly from D. G. Kerr's machinery. Although her crew were able to repair the steam pipe and alleviate the steam leak, her captain reported that the steam loss had nearly disabled her engine. In an article published in Inland Seas in 2000, historian Al Miller speculates that as D. G. Kerr and D. M. Clemson were identical in design, D. M. Clemson conceivably could have fallen victim to a similar incident.

== Wreck ==
The wreck of D. M. Clemson has never been found. She became the largest undiscovered shipwreck on the Great Lakes following the discovery of the 550-foot (167.6 m) Canadian freighter James Carruthers in May 2025. The Great Lakes Shipwreck Historical Society has searched for the wreck since at least 2002. During an August 2007 expedition, they found the hull of a large freighter 8 miles (12.9 km) north of Deer Park, Michigan, at a depth of 460 feet (140.2 m). The measurements of the wreck taken via side-scan sonar, as well as its upbound orientation, led them to suspect they had located D. M. Clemson. However, footage taken from a remotely operated vehicle identified the wreck as the freighter Cyprus, which was lost a year before D. M. Clemson.

== Sources ==
- "A Collision – Clemson and Neilson Came Together Off Middle Island". The Times Herald. Port Huron, Michigan. 21 June 1907. p. 11 – via Newspapers.com.
- Sundstrom, E. L. (4 October 1969). "A Friendly Blast – 3 Long, 2 Short". The Sault News. Sault Ste. Marie, Michigan. p. 6 – via Newspapers.com.
- "Aground and Released". The Plain Dealer. Cleveland. 14 April 1906. p. 10 – via Newspapers.com.
- "A Record for Shipbuilding". The Plain Dealer. Cleveland. 27 June 1903. p. 5 – via Newspapers.com.
- "Around the Lakes". The Marine Review. 28 (1). Cleveland: The Marine Review: 23. 2 July 1903 – via Maritime History of the Great Lakes.
- Baillod, Brendon (2025). "Lost Leviathans: Lake Superior". Madison, Wisconsin: Great Lakes Shipwreck Research – via Prezi.
- "Bar Formed in Harbor". The Cleveland Leader. Cleveland. 27 October 1903. p. 9 – via Newspapers.com.
- "Big Coal Cargo". Detroit Free Press. 23 July 1904. p. 7 – via Newspapers.com.
- "Boat Lost On Lake Superior". Detroit Free Press. 5 December 1908. p. 1 – via Newspapers.com.
- "Boats Collide in Fog". Detroit Free Press. 21 June 1907. p. 9 – via Newspapers.com.
- "Body From Clemson Was Ship's Watchman". The Duluth News Tribune. Duluth, Minnesota. 30 December 1908. p. 8 – via Newspapers.com.
- "Body From Str. Clemson Found-Lake Swallows It". The Duluth News Tribune. Duluth, Minnesota. 16 December 1908. p. 14 – via Newspapers.com.
- "Bottle Purported to Be From Steamer Clemson". The Duluth News Tribune. Duluth, Minnesota. 1 September 1909. p. 5 – via Newspapers.com.
- Bowlus, W. Bruce (2010). Iron Ore Transport on the Great Lakes: The Development of a Delivery System to Feed American Industry. Jefferson, North Carolina: McFarland & Company, Inc. ISBN 978-0-786433-26-1.
- Boyer, Dwight (1966). Great Stories of the Great Lakes. New York City: Dodd, Mead and Company. ISBN 978-0-396053-74-3.
- Bugbee, Gordon P. (February 1962a). "Iron Merchant Ships: An Upper Lakes Centennial - Part One" (PDF). Telescope. 11 (2). Detroit: Great Lakes Maritime Institute: 24–27 – via Maritime History of the Great Lakes.
- Bugbee, Gordon P. (March 1962b). "Iron Merchant Ships: An Upper Lakes Cenntenial – Part Two" (PDF). Telescope. 11 (3). Detroit: Great Lakes Maritime Institute: 46–51 – via Maritime History of the Great Lakes.
- "Channel System of Ship Construction". The Marine Review. 11 (18). Cleveland: The Marine Review: 6. 2 May 1895 – via Maritime History of the Great Lakes.
- "Channel System of Construction". The Marine Review. 12 (12). Cleveland: 13–22. 12 September 1895 – via Maritime History of the Great Lakes.
- "Choctaw Shipwreck Site National Register of Historic Places Registration Form" (PDF). Washington D.C.: National Park Service. 2018. Archived from the original (PDF) on 1 January 2019.
- "Clemson Ashore on Point Pelee". The Duluth News Tribune. Duluth, Minnesota. 25 October 1908. p. 23 – via Newspapers.com.
- "Clemson Crew Probably Dead". The Plain Dealer. Cleveland. 7 December 1908. p. 1 – via Newspapers.com.
- "Clemson, D. M." Bowling Green, Ohio: Bowling Green State University. Archived from the original on 26 January 2018 – via Historical Collections of the Great Lakes.
- "Clemson's First Trip". Detroit Free Press. 14 August 1903. p. 7 – via Newspapers.com.
- "Clemson Goes Aground". Buffalo Courier-Express. 27 September 1905. p. 11 – via Newspapers.com.
- "Clemson Had Perilous Time". Detroit Free Press. 3 September 1905. p. 3 – via Newspapers.com.
- "Clemson in Hard Luck". Detroit Free Press. 27 September 1905. p. 9 – via Newspapers.com.
- "Clemson Released". Detroit Free Press. 14 August 1904. p. 6 – via Newspapers.com.
- "Clemson Stuck in River". Detroit Free Press. 13 August 1904. p. 9 – via Newspapers.com.
- "Clemson Takes Immense Cargo". The Duluth News Tribune. Duluth, Minnesota. 21 November 1903. p. 8 – via Newspapers.com.
- "Crew Taken Off By Life Savers". The Plain Dealer. Cleveland. 25 October 1908. p. 8 – via Newspapers.com.
- "Cyprus". Great Lakes Shipwreck Historical Society. Sault Ste. Marie, Michigan: Great Lakes Shipwreck Historical Society. 2007. Archived from the original on 28 February 2016.
- "Daniel M. Clemson". The Pittsburgh Post. 7 March 1903. p. 13 – via Newspapers.com.
- "D. M. Clemson Aground". Buffalo Courier. 27 September 1905. p. 2 – via Newspapers.com.
- Donahue, James L. (3 December 1989). "Mystery: Why Did Clemson Sink?". The Times Herald. Port Huron, Michigan. p. 16 – via Newspapers.com.
- "Double Launching – Two New Boats Dropped Into Water at Duluth". Detroit Free Press. 4 July 1903. p. 3 – via Newspapers.com.
- "Duluth News Notes". The Marine Review. 27 (13). Cleveland: The Marine Review: 26. 26 March 1903 – via Maritime History of the Great Lakes.
- "First Death Among Six Sailor Brothers". Detroit Free Press. 21 December 1908. p. 6 – via Newspapers.com.
- Flesher, John (10 September 2007). "Century–Old Shipwreck Discovered in Lake Superior". The Times Herald. Port Huron, Michigan. p. 8 – via Newspapers.com.
- "From the Head of the Lakes". The Marine Review. 27 (26). Cleveland: The Marine Review: 22. 25 June 1903 – via Maritime History of the Great Lakes.
- Green, Fred W. (1912). "Mitchell & Co.'s Marine Directory of the Great Lakes – 1912". Cleveland: Bureau Veritas. p. 107 – via Maritime History of the Great Lakes.
- Herriman, H. N. (1905). "Great Lakes Register – For the Construction and Classification of Steel and Wooden Vessels – 1905". Chicago: Lakeside Press. p. 41 – via Maritime History of the Great Lakes.
- "Hit the Breakwater". The Plain Dealer. Cleveland. 21 October 1908. p. 7 – via Newspapers.com.
- "Hit the Lighthouse". The Plain Dealer. Cleveland. 24 October 1908. p. 7 – via Newspapers.com.
- "Hunt for Steamer Clemson Futile". The Duluth News Tribune. Duluth, Minnesota. 8 December 1908. p. 4 – via Newspapers.com.
- "Identity of Lost Boat a Mystery". The Duluth News Tribune. Duluth, Minnesota. 6 December 1908. p. 1 – via Newspapers.com.
- "Identity of Lost Boat a Mystery". The Duluth News Tribune. Duluth, Minnesota. 6 December 1908. p. 23 – via Newspapers.com.
- "Interesting Items Telegraphed from Lake and River Ports". The Times Herald. Port Huron, Michigan. 31 October 1903. p. 7 – via Newspapers.com.
- "Iron Ore Shipment a Record". Minneapolis Daily Times. 17 August 1903. p. 6 – via Newspapers.com.
- "Is Message From the Lost Clemson?". The Minneapolis Journal. 1 September 1909. p. 4 – via Newspapers.com.
- "Is Washed Ashore – Body Thought to Be From Sunken Clemson". The Bay City Times. Bay City, Michigan. 19 May 1909. p. 4 – via Newspapers.com.
- "Lake Erie". The Plain Dealer. Cleveland. 21 August 1903. p. 5 – via Newspapers.com.
- "Lake Erie". The Plain Dealer. Cleveland. 25 November 1908. p. 5 – via Newspapers.com.
- "Lake Erie". The Plain Dealer. Cleveland. 28 November 1908. p. 7 – via Newspapers.com.
- "Lake is Giving Up Crew of Steamer Clemson". The Duluth News Tribune. Duluth, Minnesota. 17 December 1908. p. 20 – via Newspapers.com.
- "Launch Three Wolvin Boats". Detroit Free Press. 26 June 1903. p. 9 – via Newspapers.com.
- "Likely That Clemson Sank Without Warning". Detroit Free Press. 11 December 1908. p. 10 – via Newspapers.com.
- Lofton, Justine (2025). "Found: Largest Missing Shipwreck in the Great Lakes". MLive Media Group. Grand Rapids, Michigan.
- "Many Damaged Plates". The Times Herald. Port Huron, Michigan. 20 September 1905. p. 7 – via Newspapers.com.
- "Marine Notes". Detroit Free Press. 11 March 1903. p. 11 – via Newspapers.com.
- "Marine Notes". The Plain Dealer. Cleveland. 29 August 1903. p. 8 – via Newspapers.com.
- "Marine Notes". The Duluth News Tribune. Duluth, Minnesota. 1 December 1908. p. 2 – via Newspapers.com.
- "Marne Notes". The Duluth News Tribune. Duluth, Minnesota. 14 September 1905. p. 7 – via Newspapers.com.
- "May 2002". Inland Seas. 58 (3). Toledo, Ohio: Great Lakes Historical Society: 237–244. 2002 – via National Museum of the Great Lakes.
- "More Wreckage From Steamer Clemson Found". The Duluth News Tribune. Duluth, Minnesota. 12 December 1908. p. 4 – via Newspapers.com.
- Miller, Al (2000). "Gone So Terribly Into the Unknown – the Story of the D. M. Clemson". Inland Seas. 56 (2). Toledo, Ohio: Great Lakes Historical Society: 100–109 – via National Museum of the Great Lakes.
- Miller, Al (2002). "Teeming With Enterprise – Augustus B. Wolvin's Life on the Great Lakes". Inland Seas. 58 (1). Toledo, Ohio: Great Lakes Historical Society: 7–27 – via National Museum of the Great Lakes.
- "No Trace of the Clemson Or Her Ill-Fated Sailors". The Duluth News Tribune. Duluth, Minnesota. 10 December 1908. p. 1 – via Newspapers.com.
- "No Word From the Clemson Or Her Luckless Crew". The Duluth News Tribune. Duluth, Minnesota. 9 December 1908. p. 1 – via Newspapers.com.
- "One Life Lost in Gale on the Lake". The Duluth News Tribune. Duluth, Minnesota. 3 September 1905. p. 3 – via Newspapers.com.
- "Only One Body From Clemson Came Ashore". The Duluth News Tribune. Duluth, Minnesota. 18 December 1908. p. 14 – via Newspapers.com.
- "Ore Capacity of Str. Clemson". The Duluth News Tribune. Duluth, Minnesota. 17 August 1903. p. 3 – via Newspapers.com.
- "Paliki (1889, Bulk Freighter)". Alpena, Michigan: Alpena County George N. Fletcher Public Library.
- "Ship Material is Scarce". The Cleveland Leader. 13 August 1902. p. 9 – via Newspapers.com.
- "Ship of the Month No. 168: Saskadoc". The Scanner. 21 (2). Toronto Marine Historical Society: 7–11. November 1988 – via Maritime History of the Great Lakes.
- "Shipwreck Coast National Marine Sanctuary Proposal" (PDF). Washington D.C.: National Oceanic and Atmospheric Administration. 2017.
- "Sixteen Boats Pass Out of Existence". Detroit Free Press. 24 December 1908. p. 9 – via Newspapers.com.
- "Steamer Clemson and Crew of 24 May Have Gone to the Bottom of Lake". The Duluth News Tribune. Duluth, Minnesota. 7 December 1908. p. 1 – via Newspapers.com.
- "Steamer Clemson Floated". Buffalo Courier. 28 September 1905. p. 2 – via Newspapers.com.
- "Steamer Clemson Hits Pier at Ashtabula". The Duluth News Tribune. Duluth, Minnesota. 21 October 1908. p. 9 – via Newspapers.com.
- "Steamer Reed's Maiden Trip". The Duluth News Tribune. Duluth, Minnesota. 22 July 1903. p. 8 – via Newspapers.com.
- "Steel Boats in Commission". The Duluth News Tribune. Duluth, Minnesota. 23 June 1904. p. 8 – via Newspapers.com.
- Stonehouse, Frederick (1990) [1984]. Went Missing, II. Au Train, Michigan: Avery Color Studios. ISBN 978-0-932212-37-5.
- "Storm's Fury Unsurpassed". The Cleveland Leader. 5 September 1905. p. 1 – via Newspapers.com.
- "Storm Was Terrific". The Times Herald. Port Huron, Michigan. 17 December 1908. p. 10 – via Newspapers.com.
- "Strike May Not Cause Total Tie–Up". The Duluth News Tribune. Duluth, Minnesota. 21 September 1903. p. 1 – via Newspapers.com.
- "Tampa is Safe, Clemson Missing". Detroit Free Press. 6 December 1908. p. 1 – via Newspapers.com.
- "The Lake Captain – Organized Labor". The Marine Review. 28 (14). Cleveland: The Marine Review: 17–18. 1 October 1903 – via Maritime History of the Great Lakes.
- "The Soo". The Times Herald. Port Huron, Michigan. 17 August 1903. p. 7 – via Newspapers.com.
- "The Soo". Detroit Free Press. 1 December 1908. p. 8 – via Newspapers.com.
- "Think Clemson Lost Like Cyprus a Year Ago". Detroit Free Press. 9 December 1908. p. 11 – via Newspapers.com.
- Thompson, Mark L. (1994). Queen of the Lakes. Detroit: Wayne State University Press. ISBN 978-0-814343-36-4.
- "Three More Boats Planned". The Duluth News Tribune. Duluth, Minnesota. 23 July 1902. p. 2 – via Newspapers.com.
- "Three New Steamships for the Upper Lakes". The Montreal Star. 23 July 1902. p. 10 – via Newspapers.com.
- "Three Steamers Aground". Detroit Free Press. 27 October 1903. p. 9 – via Newspapers.com.
- "Twins Are Monsters". The Duluth News Tribune. Duluth, Minnesota. 23 March 1903. p. 3 – via Newspapers.com.
- "Two Launchings Next Saturday". The Duluth News Tribune. Duluth, Minnesota. 23 June 1903. p. 6 – via Newspapers.com.
- "Two New Boats to Be Launched". The Duluth News Tribune. Duluth, Minnesota. 2 July 1903. p. 8 – via Newspapers.com.
- "Two Records Smashed - Provident Boats Hold Banner For Big Cargoes". Detroit Free Press. 22 November 1903. p. 10 – via Newspapers.com.
- "Vessel Movements". Detroit Free Press. 29 November 1908. p. 23 – via Newspapers.com.
- "Vessel Passages – Passed Detroit". The Duluth News Tribune. Duluth, Minnesota. 29 November 1908. p. 14 – via Newspapers.com.
- "Vessel Passages – Detroit". Detroit Free Press. 19 August 1903. p. 7 – via Newspapers.com.
- "Whitefish Point Woman Studies Lake Superior Shipwrecks". The Sault News. Sault Ste. Marie, Michigan. 2 January 1973. p. 12 – via Newspapers.com.
- "Will Be Named for Local Man". The Plain Dealer. Cleveland. 25 June 1903. p. 3 – via Newspapers.com.
- "Will Fight to Finish". Detroit Free Press. 16 September 1903. p. 3 – via Newspapers.com.
- Witsil, Frank (2025). "Lost in Lake Huron for More Than 100 Years, the Carruthers is Finally Found". Detroit Free Press.
- Wolff, Julius F. Jr. (1972). "The Shipwrecks of Lake Superior, 1900 – 1909". Inland Seas. 28 (1). Toledo, Ohio: Great Lakes Historical Society: 51–63 – via National Museum of the Great Lakes.
- Wolff, Julius F. Jr. (December 1973). "They Sailed Away On Lake Superior". Inland Seas. 29 (4). Toledo, Ohio: Great Lakes Historical Society: 262–285 – via National Museum of the Great Lakes.
- Wolff, Julius F. Jr. (1990) [1979]. Lake Superior Shipwrecks: Complete Reference to Maritime Accidents and Disasters. Duluth, Minnesota: Lake Superior Port Cities Inc. ISBN 978-0-942235-01-2.
- "Wolvin's Remarkable Unloading Record". The Marine Review. 30 (4). Cleveland: The Marine Review: 21. 28 July 1904 – via Maritime History of the Great Lakes.
- "Workmen Paid at Sault Ste. Marie". The Marine Review. 28 (15). Cleveland: The Marine Review: 25. 8 October 1903 – via Maritime History of the Great Lakes.
- "Wreckage Has Been Identified". Detroit Free Press. 8 December 1908. p. 1 – via Newspapers.com.
- "Wreckage Found – Caribou Brings End of an Oar Blade From Clemson to the Soo". The Times Herald. Port Huron, Michigan. 22 May 1909. p. 8 – via Newspapers.com.
- "Wreckage From Clemson Tells Vessel's Fate; All Hope for Ill-Starred Ship and Crew Gone". The Duluth News Tribune. Duluth, Minnesota. 11 December 1908. p. 1 – via Newspapers.com.
