= SS Cyprus =

Lake freighter that sank in Lake Superior

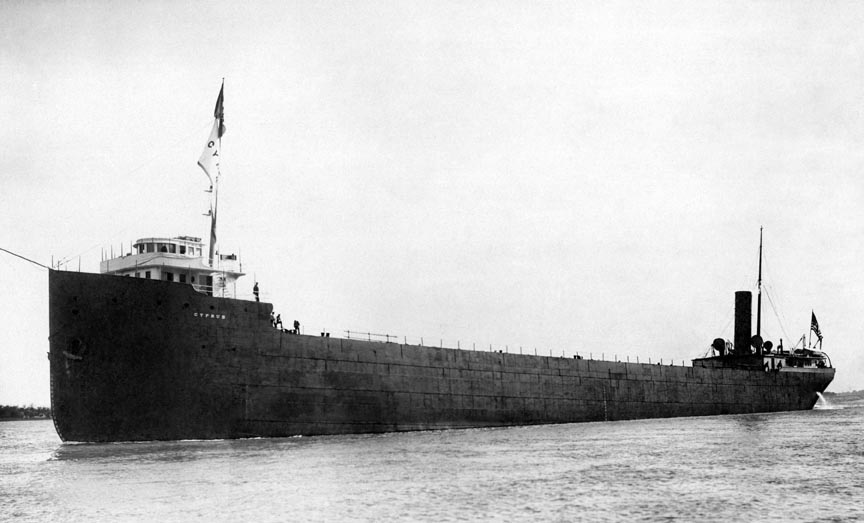
- SS Cyprus

History

United States
- Name: Cyprus
- Owner: Pickands-Mather of Cleveland, Ohio
- Builder: American Ship Building Company of Lorain, Ohio
- Yard number: 353
- Launched: 17 August 1907
- Identification: United States Registry #204527
- Fate: Foundered and sunk during a storm on October 11, 1907.

General characteristics
- Class & type: Lake freighter
- Length: 420 ft (130 m)
- Beam: 52 ft (16 m)
- Height: 28 ft (8.5 m)

SS Cyprus was a lake freighter that sank during a gale storm on Lake Superior on 11 October 1907. The ship went down in 460 feet (140 m) of water at 46.79°N 85.60°W, about 8 miles (7.0 nautical miles; 13 kilometres) north of Deer Park in Luce County, Michigan. All but one of the 23 members of the crew perished.

== Construction ==
Cyprus was built in Lorain, Ohio and launched 17 August 1907. She was a 420-foot-long (130 m), 15,000 short tons (14,000 t) steel-hulled steamer. She was owned by the Lackawanna Steamship Company, (a subsidiary of Pickands Mather and Company) and based out of Fairport, Ohio, northeast of Cleveland, on Lake Erie. A marine trade publication described Cyprus as a very seaworthy vessel in an article published after her sinking.

== Sinking ==
On only her second voyage, Cyprus was hauling iron ore from Superior, Wisconsin to Buffalo, New York when a moderate gale arose off Deer Park. The gale, according to contemporary accounts, was reported as nothing that Cyprus couldn't have handled. According to Second Mate Charles G. Pitz — the sole survivor — Cyprus had been pounded by northwesterly waves all afternoon which caused an increasing list to port. At around 7:45 p.m. the ship lurched to port and capsized. Pitz and three others, which included Captain F. B. Huyck (according to some accounts) secured themselves on a raft. By 2:00 a.m. the raft and its occupants were within 300 feet (91 m) of shore when breaking waves flipped the raft, and all but Pitz drowned in the surf. Pitz unwittingly staggered ashore, just a half-mile east of the Deer Park Life-Saving Station. All but two bodies were eventually recovered.

It was never clear what caused the ship to list in the first place. Another steamer, George Stephenson out of Pittsburgh, had passed Cyprus that afternoon and had noted that Cyprus was trailing a red wake, indicating that water was mixing with iron ore dust in its cargo hold before being pumped out. Speculation on the source of the leak has centered on the type of Mulholland sliding hatch cover the nearly new ship had been outfitted with. With a steel on steel seal, this type of hatch was prone to allowing water past unless special tarpaulins were fitted on the hatches. It was not clear if Huyck had ordered these tarpaulins deployed or not.

Some alternate theories propose that the engine or rudder failed, leaving Cyprus without the maneuverability needed to avoid wave troughs where ships are most vulnerable to rolling, or propose that labor unrest in Lorain during Cyprus’ construction may have contributed to other, as yet undiscovered flaws. The vessel was a $280,000 loss.

== Rediscovery ==
Wreck location

In early August 2007 members of the Great Lakes Shipwreck Historical Society were using side-scan sonar to search for wrecks off Deer Park when they detected a large object on the bottom of Lake Superior. According to their best guess, it was the SS D.M. Clemson, which sank in that area with all hands on 1 December 1908. A follow-up visit to the vessel with a submersible ROV was made on 18 August 2007. Attempts to identify the vessel as D.M. Clemson were frustrated when the ship's name was not on the bow in the place where searchers expected to find it. They then sent the ROV to the stern where they made the startling discovery that it was, in fact, the Cyprus they had located. The Shipwreck Society had previously believed that Cyprus was some ten miles (16 km) north of where it was found. Cyprus was discovered lying on her port side in about 460 feet of water. Her hull is totally intact, which is surprising considering the rather violent manner in which she foundered. Wreckage consisting of wall panelings, doors, railings, pipes, and her cargo of iron ore are scattered about the bottom up to 270 feet away from the wreck. Her name and port of call remains completely legible on her stern.

The Shipwreck Society has plans to return to the wreck in the future for forensic research in order to answer some of the lingering questions relating to the sinking of Cyprus.

== See also ==
- Graveyard of the Great Lakes
