= Ashtabula Harbor Light =

Lighthouse in Ohio, US

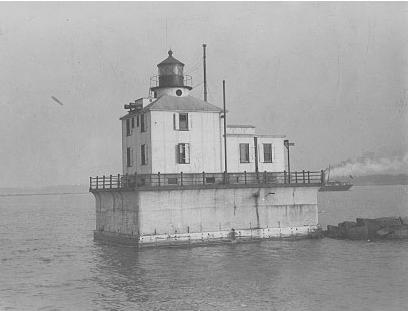
- Ashtabula Harbor Light before extension of breakwater
- Location: Ashtabula Harbor, Lake Erie, Ashtabula, Ohio
- Coordinates: 41.9186°N 80.7959°W

Tower
- Foundation: Concrete crib
- Construction: Steel/Iron plate
- Automated: 1973
- Height: 40 feet (12 m)
- Shape: rectangular house with central cylindrical tower
- Markings: white, red roof & parapet, green trim
- Heritage: National Register of Historic Places listed place

Light
- First lit: 1905
- Focal height: 51 feet (16 m)
- Lens: Fourth Fresnel lens
- Range: 7.8 nautical miles; 14 kilometres (9 mi)
- Characteristic: 6 sec Yellow flashing
- Ashtabula Harbor Light
- U.S. National Register of Historic Places
- MPS: U.S. Coast Guard Lighthouses and Light Stations on the Great Lakes TR
- NRHP reference No.: 83001943
- Added to NRHP: 1983-08-04

Ashtabula Harbor Light (also known as Ashtabula Light) is a lighthouse in Ashtabula, Ohio. It was listed in the National Register on August 8, 1983.

== History ==
The first light marking Ashtabula's harbor was built in 1836, a short hexagonal wooden tower standing on a wooden crib just off the eastern pier. This used the oil lamps typical of the time and remained in service until replaced by a new tower on the west pier, a pyramidal tower with clapboard sides. This change was prompted by changes in the harbor configuration. The new light was equipped with a fourth-order Fresnel lens, exhibiting a red light. Keepers lived in a frame house in town. This tower was moved in 1882 but remained in service.

In 1905 the Ashtabula River mouth was widened and breakwater constructed, prompting construction of the third light, the structure that exists today. This building was originally placed 1750 feet SSE of its present location, but was moved and enlarged in 1915, placed on a concrete crib at the end of the north breakwater. The new house, built of steel and iron plate, afforded living quarters for the keepers. At the same time a new fourth-order lens was mounted in the tower. The old light was by this time left standing by itself, sixty feet from shore.

The new light's exposed position made it vulnerable to various assaults. In 1927 it was struck by a steamship, shifting it six inches off its base. The following year, however, a more famous incident occurred. An ice storm completely encased the light, trapping the keepers inside. After two days they managed to thaw the front door sufficiently to get it open, only to have to tunnel through some five feet of ice in order to escape.

The light was the last Great Lakes light to be staffed, and was finally automated in 1973. The original keeper's house was deeded to the city in the same year, but returned to federal ownership in 1976 due to a lack of funds to complete a plan to convert the building to a museum. In 1982 the building again passed into private hands and was opened in 1984 as the Ashtabula Marine Museum. The lighthouse itself continued in service, even as the breakwater was extended past it. The Fresnel lens was replaced with a modern beacon and given to the museum in 1995.

Cleveland resident Jim Woodward, one of only four men in the U.S. who can properly be called “lampists,” (one who is qualified to repair and restore the classical Fresnel lighthouse lenses) restored the lens. He is the only one of the four who apprenticed under a lampist in the old United States Lighthouse Service.

In 2003 a society was formed to take possession of the light under the National Historic Lighthouse Preservation Act, and they applied for the light when it was offered in the following year. They assumed control of the light in 2007 and began a program of restoration with the intent of making the lighthouse available for public tours. In May 2008 they received a grant to allow them to construct a floating dock, necessary since all access to the light is by water. The Society has in fact acquired the light.
