= Frame (nautical) =

Transverse support of a sailing vessel

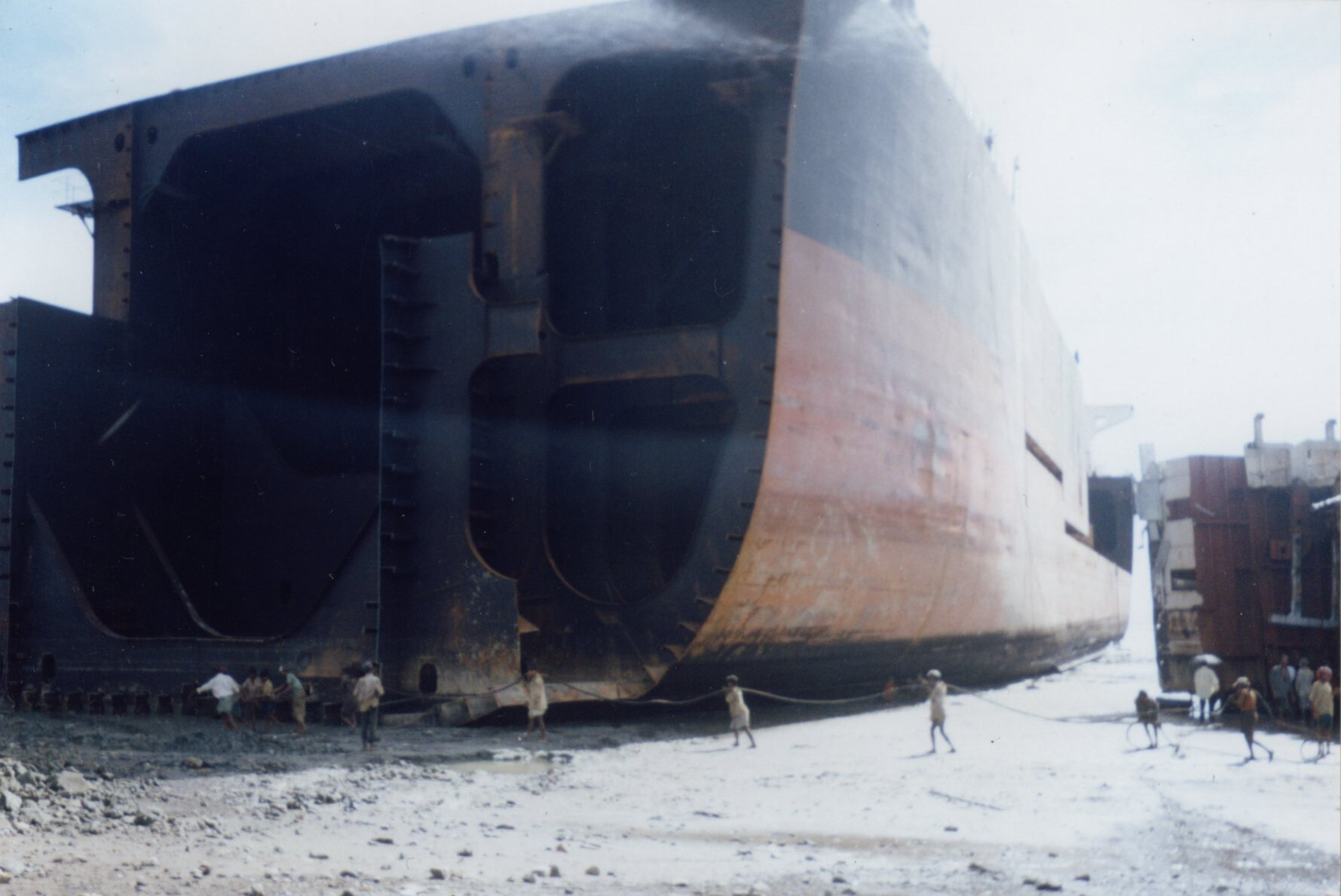
A ship's frames are exposed as it is broken near Chittagong, Bangladesh

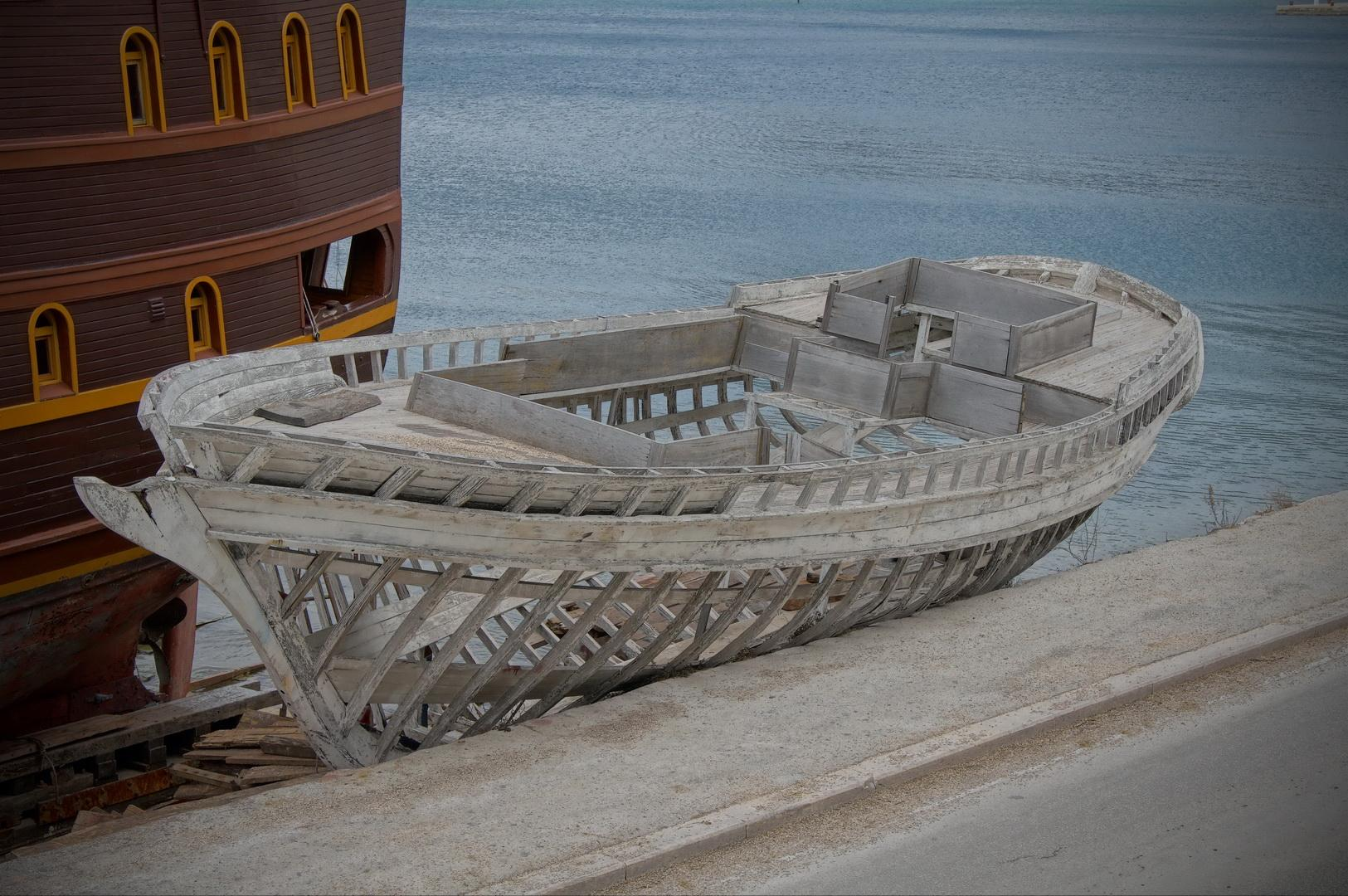
Ship frames visible in an old wooden ship skeleton; Omiš, Feb 20, 2012

In ships, frames are ribs that are transverse bolted or welded to the keel. Frames support the hull and give the ship its shape and strength.

In wooden shipbuilding, each frame is composed of several sections, so that the grain of the wood can follow the curve of the frame. Starting from the keel, these are the floor (which crosses the keel and joins the frame to the keel), the first futtock, the second futtock, the top timber, and the rail stanchion. In steel shipbuilding, the entire frame can be formed in one piece by rivetting or welding sections; in this case the floor remains a separate piece, joining the frame on each side to the keel.

Frame numbers are the numerical values given to the frames. Frame numbers typically begin at 1 with the forward-most frame for US-built ships, and typically begin at 0 with the transom for ships built elsewhere, with numbers increasing sequentially towards the stern or bow, respectively. The total number vary per the length of a ship. Frame numbers are useful for wayfinding, identifying a location in relation to either the bow or the stern of the ship.

The frames support lengthwise members which run parallel to the keel, from the bow to the stern; these may variously be called stringers, strakes, or clamps. The clamp supports the transverse deck beams, on which the deck is laid.
