= National Museum of the Great Lakes =

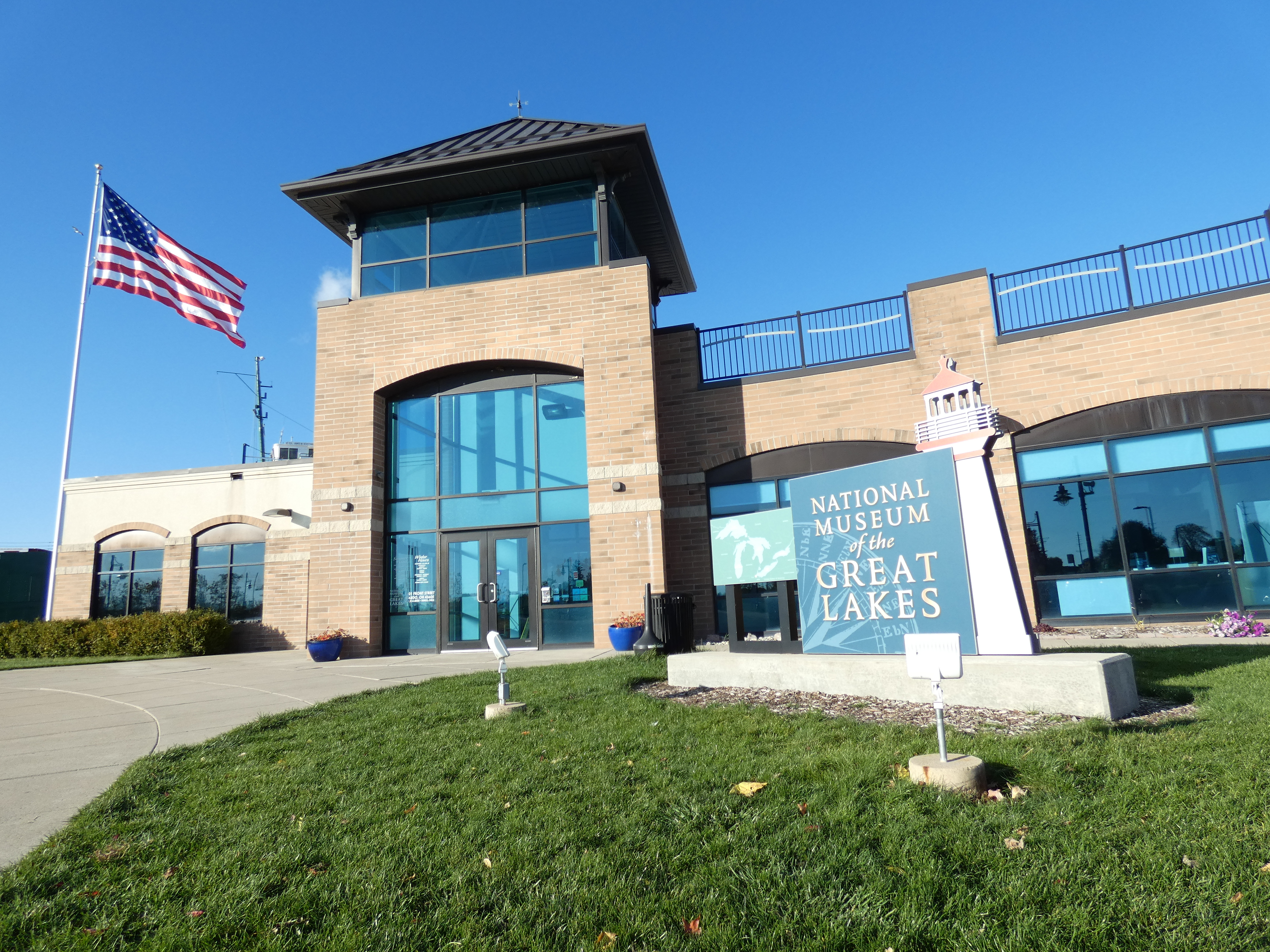
- Entrance to museum
- Established: 2014
- Location: 1701 Front Street; Toledo, Ohio
- Coordinates: 41°39′24″N 83°30′54″W
- Type: Maritime museum
- Website: www.nmgl.org

The National Museum of the Great Lakes is a museum in the Toledo Maritime Center, a heritage location on the banks of the Maumee River on the east side of Toledo, Ohio. Operated by the Great Lakes Historical Society, it celebrates the natural and built heritage of the North American Great Lakes from a U.S. perspective. The museum is most noted as the docking location of a museum Lake freighter, the SS Col. James M. Schoonmaker.

== Description ==
The National Museum of the Great Lakes (NMGL) grew out of the Great Lakes Historical Society, a nonprofit organization of Great Lakes enthusiasts centered in the Cleveland area. For many years, the Society operated a small museum in Vermilion, Ohio. The Society moved its operations and opened a larger museum structure in Toledo in 2014, stimulated by the chance to combine its museum functions with the display of a historic lake freighter from the Second Industrial Revolution. The Schoonmaker is, as of 2019, moored adjacent to the museum. The 1911-launched vessel's riveted plates and pre-radar pilothouse show the technology available to shipbuilders and mariners at the beginning of the 1900s. The vessel is open to the public during the warm months. In 2018, the museum acquired through donation the retired Great Lakes Towing Co. tug Ohio. Plans are to refurbish the tug and open it for tours in the spring of 2019.

The NMGL has taken on a growing affiliate role in the discovery, identification, and preservation of sunken ships in Lake Erie. With advances in maritime technology, it has become possible to find and identify an increasing percentage of these hulks. Sunken boats and ships, particularly vessels built before 1900, can be examined to discover facts about boatbuilding and maritime experience that are not clearly written down in historical texts.

The NMGL's riverfront museum structure, opened April 26, 2014, attempts to celebrate both the natural and the man-made heritage of the Great Lakes. Primary displays, including model ships, allow a visitor to move through the Lakes' 350-year history of navigation. Physical memorabilia show the moving parts of sailing and steam operation, from rigging and machinery to the cutlery and chinaware used by the Great Lakes' now-vanished fleet of steam packets and passenger liners. The museum is open year-round.

== See also ==
- Dossin Great Lakes Museum in Detroit, Michigan
