= Channel system (shipbuilding) =

Longitudinal hull framing system

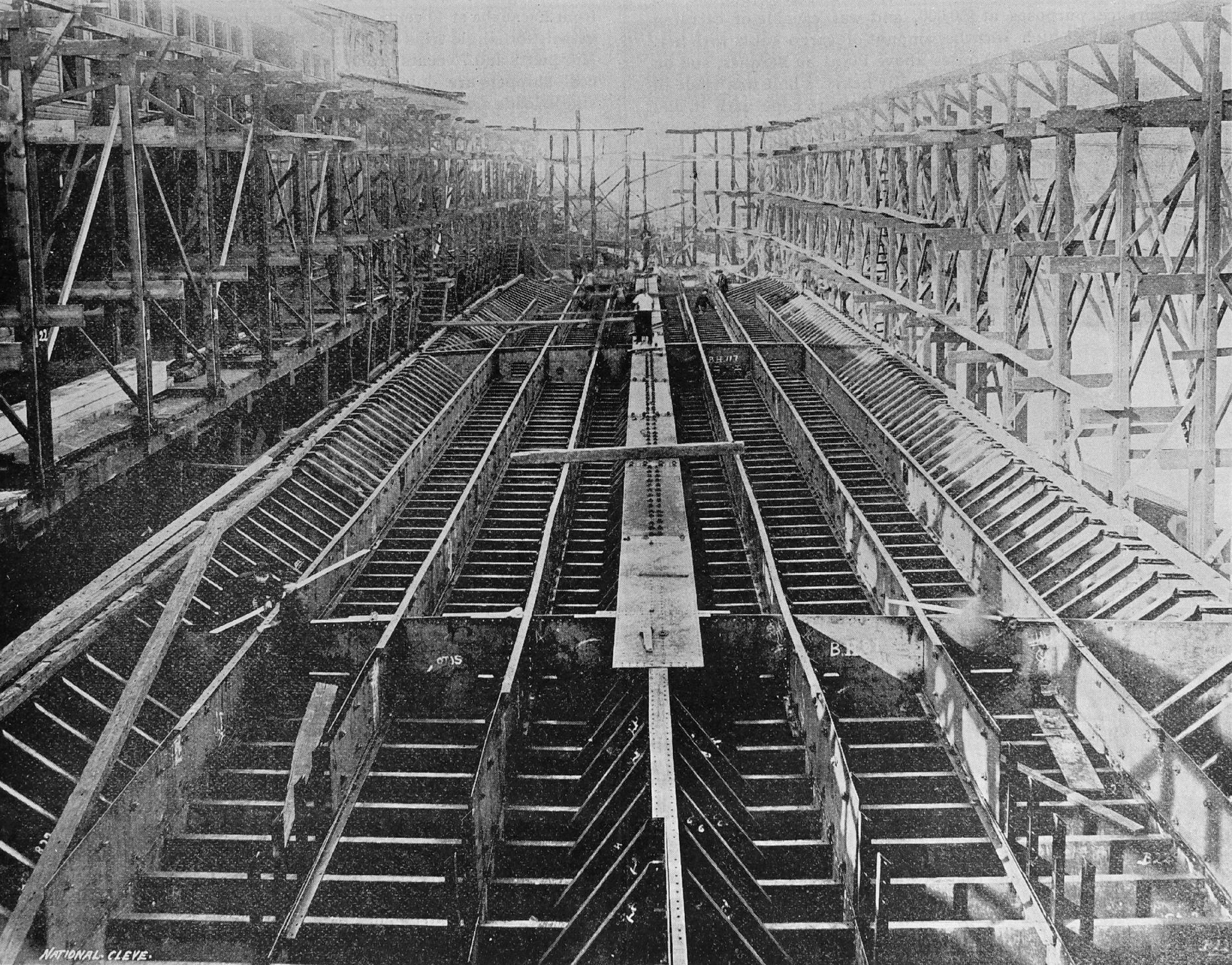
The channel system during the construction of the freighter Yale

The channel system is a method of ship construction where several rows of large, flanged steel plates run longitudinally within a ship's hull. The style derived its name from the "channels" between the frames. Invented by Sinclair Stuart, a surveyor for the United States Standard Registry of Shipping, it was introduced to the Great Lakes in the mid–1890s, becoming a standard feature of vessels built there thereafter.

This practice dispensed with the common tradition of frames composed primarily of angle iron. It lent a vessel much greater strength, prevented possible damage sustained in a grounding from spreading to other areas of a hull, and increased the cargo capacity, without expending a greater quantity of materials than the previous design.
