= The Marine Record =

- Masthead of May 12, 1883 issue of the Marine Review
- Type: Weekly newspaper
- Founder: Frank Houghton
- Founded: 1883
- Ceased publication: 1987
- City: Cleveland, Ohio

The Marine Record was a weekly newspaper published in Cleveland, Ohio from 1883 to 1987, under various names.

== History ==
The Marine Record’s earliest known proprietor was Frank Houghton, when the paper was publishing out of 171 Superior (Leader Building) and 136 Bank Streets of Cleveland, Ohio in 1883. He last appears in the March 8th, 1883 issue, prior to the Marine's offices being demolished and moved to 2 South Water Street in April of the same year. Soon after Alanson Wilcox appears as editor and proprietor until August 2, until the Marine Printing Company is credited as publisher for the rest of the summer. That fall, Albert A. Pomeroy has the position of editor and proprietor until the early 1890s, when Irving B. Smith and Capt. John Swainson are identified as publishers. During Pomeroy's tenure, the offices moved back to the Leader Building in 1884, and five years later to 181 Detroit Street.

The paper's coverage was primarily the Great Lakes region and dealt with shipping, shipbuilding matters, and items of import to the merchant marine. The front page featured illustrations of ship structures or reproductions of maritime themed art. Advertising was of products and services that would be of use to the able seaman, such as ship parts, builders, and hauling contracts.

The Marine Record had been publishing in various incarnations since 1878, and in 1902 The Marine Review was established, a publication similar in scope and name. Both papers had praise for a third publication, Marine Engineering, which would eventually absorb the two papers. Marine Engineering started in New York City, 1902, by the Marine Publishing Company out of the World Building. H. M. Swetland was listed as president and general manager, with H. F. Donaldson as editor. During this same period, the Record was acquiring the Review. In November 1935 the Review was published by Penton Publishing Company until acquired by the parent publishing company of Engineering, Simmons-Boardman Publishing.

== Title variations ==
1878? - 1902: August 14: The Marine Record

1902: August 14 - 1904: January: The Marine Record and Marine Review

1904: January - 1935: November: The Marine Review

1935: November - 1956 Marine Engineering and Shipping Review

1956 - 1987: Marine Engineering and The Log

== See also ==
- List of newspapers in the United States
