= SS Choctaw =

Unique steamship wrecked in Lake Huron in 1915

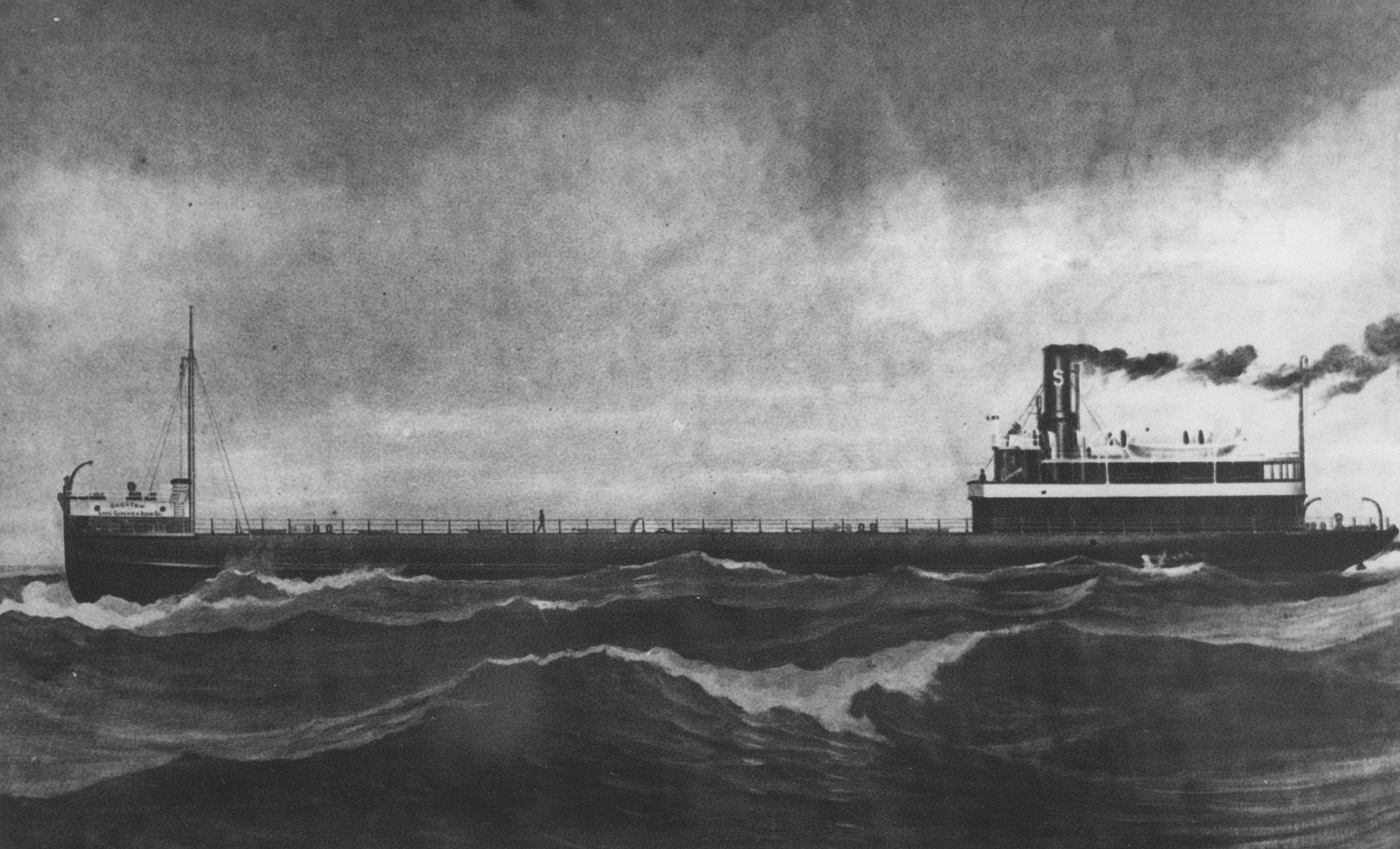
- SS Choctaw painted by Great Lakes marine artist Howard Freeman Sprague (1871–1899)

History

United States
- Name: Choctaw
- Namesake: Choctaw people
- Operator: Lake Superior Iron Company 1892 – 1894; Cleveland-Cliffs Iron Company 1894 – 1915
- Port of registry: Ishpeming, Michigan, United States
- Builder: Cleveland Shipbuilding Company
- Yard number: 17
- Launched: May 25, 1892
- In service: June 24, 1892
- Out of service: July 11, 1915
- Identification: US official number 126874
- Fate: Rammed by the Canadian steamer Wahcondah on Lake Huron, sinking shortly after the collision
- Wreck discovered: May 23, 2017

General characteristics
- Class & type: Lake freighter
- Tonnage: 1573.61 gross register tons; 1256.28 net register tons
- Length: 266.9 ft (81.4 m)
- Beam: 38.1 ft (11.6 m)
- Depth: 17.9 ft (5.5 m)
- Installed power: Engine: 900 hp (670 kW) triple expansion steam engine; Boilers: 2 × Scotch marine boilers
- Propulsion: 1 × fixed pitch propeller
- Capacity: 2,800 short tons (2,500 t)
- Crew: 22

SS Choctaw was a steel-hulled American freighter in service between 1892 and 1915, on the Great Lakes of North America. She was a so-called monitor vessel, containing elements of traditional lake freighters and the whaleback ships designed by Alexander McDougall. Choctaw was built in 1892 by the Cleveland Shipbuilding Company in Cleveland, Ohio, and was originally owned by the Lake Superior Iron Company. She was sold to the Cleveland-Cliffs Iron Company in 1894 and spent the rest of her working life with it. On her regular route between Detroit, Escanaba, Marquette (all in Michigan), and Cleveland, she carried iron ore downbound, and coal upbound.

On July 11, 1915, in foggy conditions, Choctaw was upbound for Marquette on Lake Huron with a cargo of coal from Cleveland. East of Presque Isle Light, the freighter was rammed by the downbound Canadian canaller Wahcondah. Although Choctaw sank in only 17 minutes, her crew of 22 escaped, and was picked up by Wahcondah.

For a long time, shipwreck hunters searched for the wreck of Choctaw due to her unique design. The wreck was located by a team from the Thunder Bay National Marine Sanctuary on May 23, 2017, almost 102 years after she sank. She was discovered resting under 300 feet (90 meters) of water, lying on her starboard side with the bow partially buried in the lake bottom. The wreck was listed on the National Register of Historic Places on December 10, 2018.

== History ==
=== Background ===
In 1843, the gunship USS Michigan, built in Erie, Pennsylvania, became the first iron-hulled vessel built on the Great Lakes. In the mid-1840s, Canadian merchants were importing iron vessels prefabricated by shipyards in the United Kingdom. However, it would not be until 1862 that the first iron-hulled merchant ship, Merchant, was built on the Great Lakes. Despite the success of Merchant, wooden vessels remained preferable to iron ones until the 1880s, due to their inexpensiveness, and the abundance of timber. In the early 1880s, shipyards around the Great Lakes began to construct iron ships on a relatively large scale; in 1882, Onoko, an iron freighter, temporarily became the largest ship on the lakes. In 1884, the first steel freighters were built on the Great Lakes, and by the 1890s, the majority of ships constructed on the lakes were made of steel.

Throughout the 1880s, the iron ore trade on the Great Lakes grew exponentially, primarily due to the increasing size of the lake freighters, and the rise in the number of trips made by ore boats to the ore docks of Lake Superior. As the railways were unable to keep up with the rapid production of iron ore (which was normally destined for foundries in Ohio and Pennsylvania), most of it was transported by bulk freighters. The quantity of iron ore mined from around Lake Superior rose from around 3,500,000 long tons (3,556,164 t) in 1886, to over 9,000,000 long tons (9,144,422 t) in 1890.

=== Design and construction ===
Named after the Choctaw Indian tribe from the southern United States, Choctaw was built in 1892, on the banks of the Cuyahoga River by the Cleveland Shipbuilding Company for the Lake Superior Iron Company of Ishpeming, Michigan. Her hull was 266.9 feet (81.4 m) in length with a 38.1-foot (11.6 m) beam, and had a 17.9-foot-deep (5.5 m) hold and water bottom. She had a gross register tonnage of 1573.61 tons and a net register tonnage of 1256.28 tons.

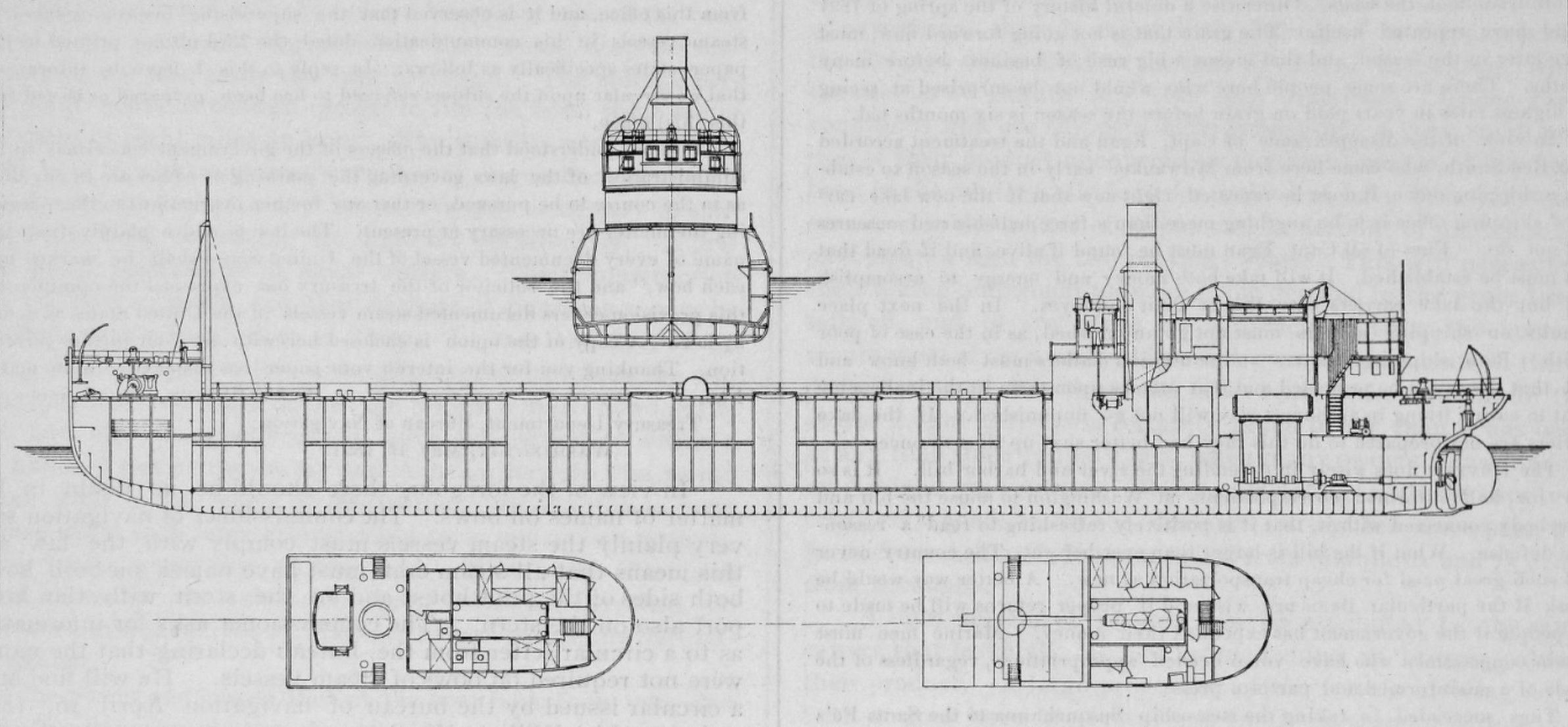
Cross section of Choctaw

The vessel had a cutaway stern and seven cargo hatches, and there were no interior bulkheads between the forward collision bulkhead and the engine bulkhead in her stern. Choctaw could carry 2,800 short tons (2,500 t) of cargo; when she was fully loaded, she had a 16-foot (4.9 m) draught. She was powered by a 900 hp (670 kW) triple expansion steam engine, steam for which was provided by two coal-fired Scotch marine boilers.

Designed by Swedish naval architect Arendt Ångström, Choctaw had an unusual design. She was a steel freighter similar to the iconic whaleback design invented by Captain Alexander McDougall, but unlike a whaleback, she had straight sides and a conventional bow. This combination meant from the waterline upward, her sides sloped inward in a "tumblehome" configuration. Ships with this hybrid design were known as "monitors", "semi-whalebacks" or "straight-backs", and like the true whalebacks, they were vulnerable to getting a wet deck in stormy conditions. Choctaw was one of only three semi-whaleback ships ever built; she had an identical sister ship named Andaste and a "near-sister" ship named Yuma. (Note: Even though Andaste is considered to be Choctaw's only truly identical sister ship, Yuma looked similar and fell into the same monitor category as the other two. Yuma sailed from her construction in 1893, was renamed Cohasset, and sank in 1948 in Chesapeake Bay.)

=== Service history ===
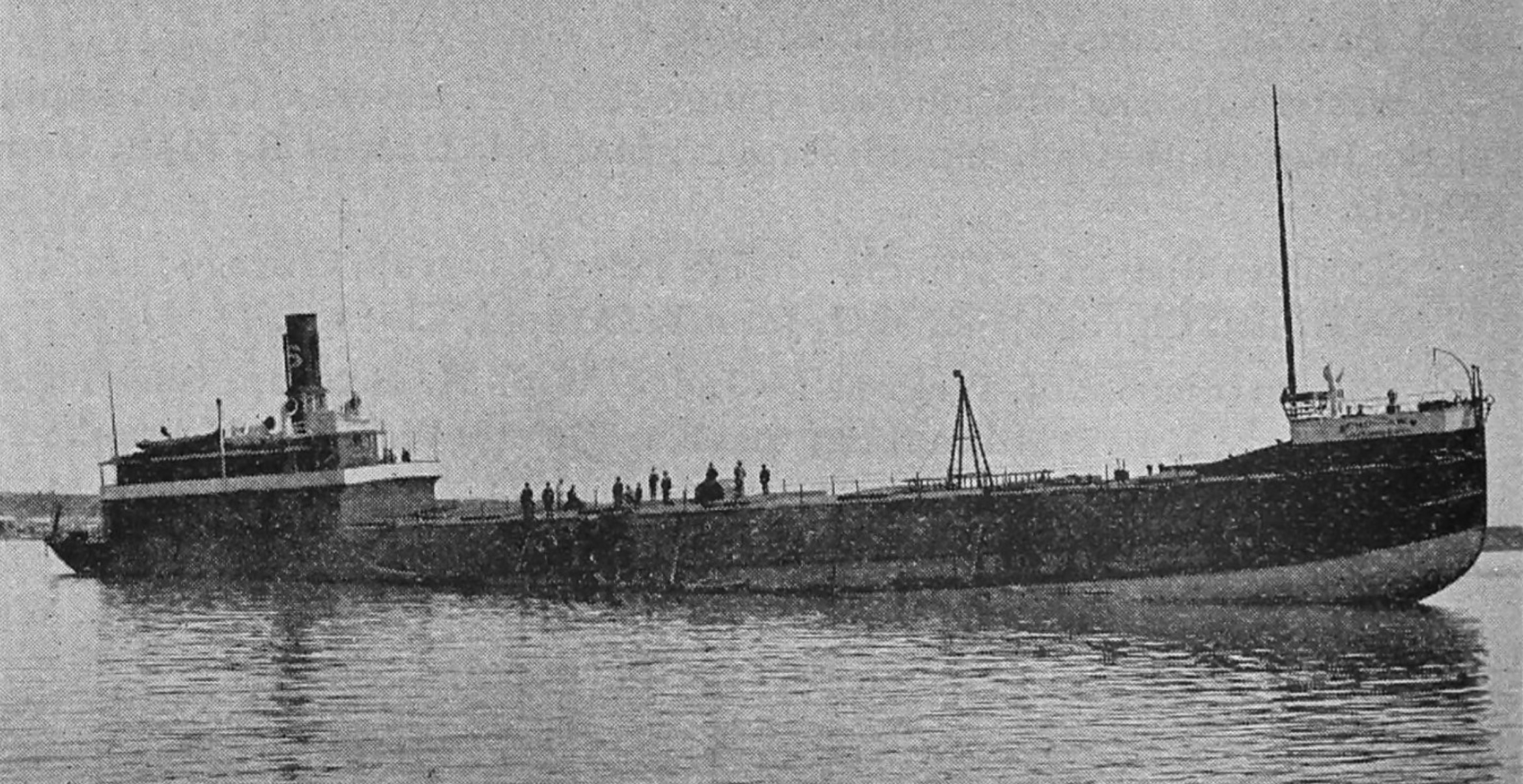
Choctaw, beached, following her collision with L.C. Waldo

Choctaw was launched on May 25, 1892, as hull number 17 and entered service later in 1892, with the official number 126874. Her regular route was between Detroit, Escanaba, Marquette (all in Michigan), and Cleveland, Ohio. She carried iron ore while downbound from Escanaba and Marquette for foundries in Detroit and Cleveland, and carried coal upbound, which fueled the mining equipment. Choctaw made her maiden voyage to Marquette in June 1892. In 1894, she was sold to the Cleveland-Cliffs Iron Company.

When Choctaw was travelling on Lake St. Clair on April 19, 1893, one of her cylinder heads exploded, scalding two firemen to death, and severely injuring another. On May 20, 1896, Choctaw collided with the larger steel freighter L.C. Waldo, which tore a 10-foot (3.0 m) hole in Choctaw's starboard side; she sank onto a shoal at the Soo Locks. On June 1, 1896, temporary repairs were made to Choctaw in Sault Ste. Marie, Michigan, before she sailed to Cleveland, Ohio.

At around 12:00 p.m. (EST) on May 26, 1900, Choctaw ran aground near Pointe aux Pins on Lake Superior, near Sault Ste. Marie, Ontario. On April 26, 1902, Choctaw struck a rock or hit the bottom after being lifted by waves near Marquette, and partially sank after reaching the shelter of Marquette Harbour.

Choctaw was in Marquette Harbour on November 9, 1913, during that year's Great Lakes Storm when her Captain Charles A. Fox saw the 545-foot-long (166 m) steel freighter Henry B. Smith leave the shelter of the harbour. This was the last time Henry B. Smith was seen afloat; she was one of the twelve ships that were lost during the storm.

=== Final voyage and collision ===
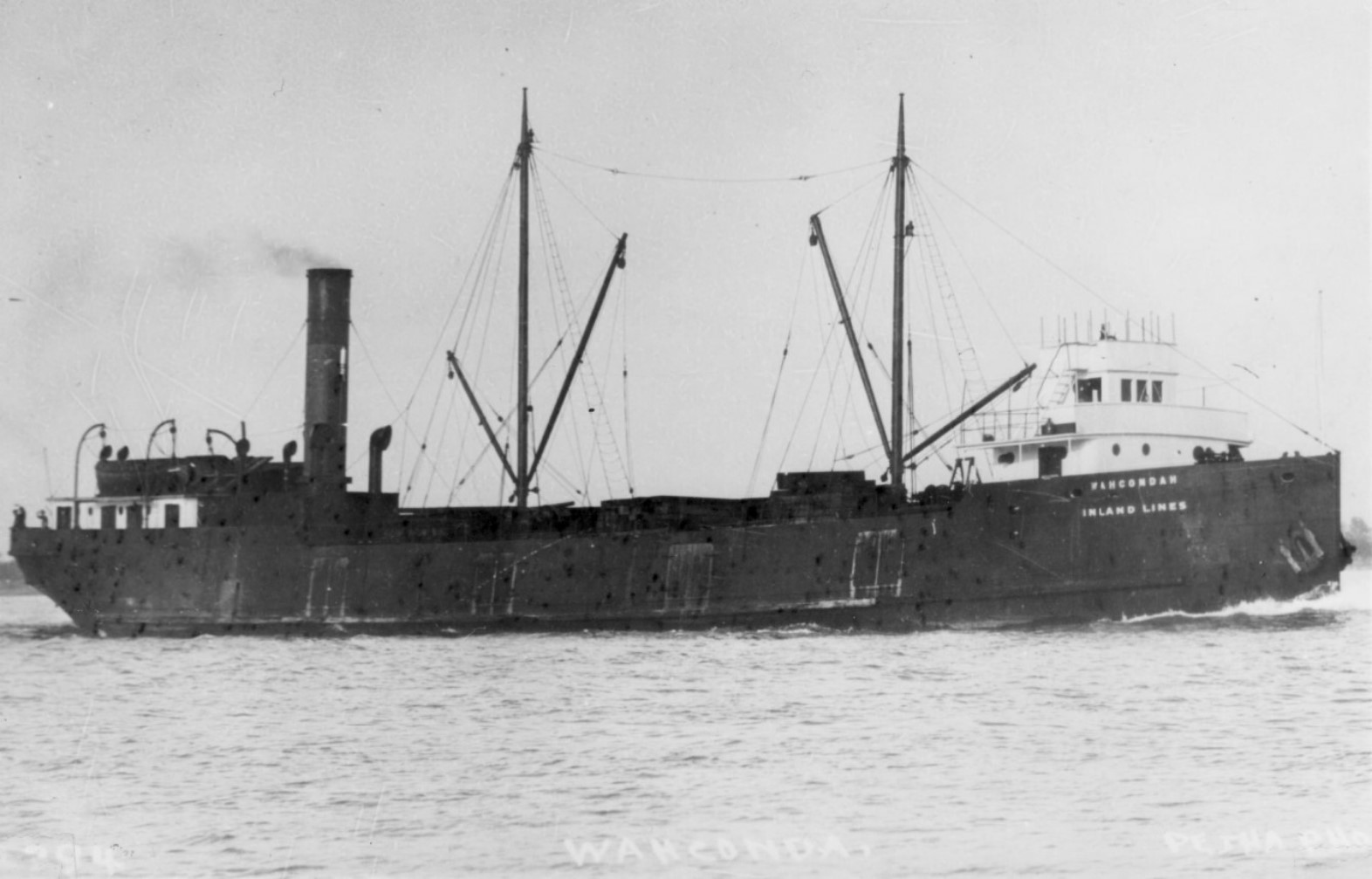
Wahcondah c. 1911

On July 11, 1915, the weather conditions on Lake Huron were very foggy. Choctaw, under the command of Captain Fox, was upbound from Cleveland for Marquette with a cargo of coal. At around 4:30 a.m. (EST), the Canadian canaller Wahcondah, which was downbound with a cargo of wheat from Fort William, Ontario to Montreal, sighted Choctaw. The captain of Wahcondah ordered the engines of his ship to be reversed but this did not stop Wahcondah from slicing into the port side of Choctaw between her first and second cargo hatches. After the collision, the captain of Wahcondah lost sight of Choctaw. The crew of Wahcondah relocated Choctaw after sighting her tall funnel through the heavy fog. Eventually, Captain Fox ordered Choctaw's lifeboats to be lowered but the vessel sank so quickly some of her crew could not make it to her lifeboats in time and had to jump overboard. The crew of Choctaw reached Wahcondah in their own lifeboats. Although Choctaw sank in only 17 minutes, her entire crew of 22 escaped. (Note: Although there were no deaths in Choctaw's sinking, the crew were originally reported as drowned.) Despite her bow sustaining significant damage, Wahcondah stayed afloat and took the crew of Choctaw to Sarnia, Ontario. The approximate location of Choctaw's sinking was given as five–six miles (8.0–9.7 km) east of Presque Isle Light. According to Fox:

We did not see the Wahcondah until she was within ten feet [3.0 m] of us. She caught us on the port side and struck beams or else she would have cut us in two. We put off in the lifeboats as quickly as possible after we knew the ship could not float. The Choctaw listed to port and began to go down at the head. Then she righted and began to list to the starboard. As she shifted to starboard her stern rose out of the water and she rolled over, going down bottom side up. We were in the yawl boats about 400 feet [120 m] away when she rolled. It sounded as if a million dishes and hundreds of sticks were being broken as the ship rolled over.

The day after she sank, Captain Nelson Brown of the steamer James H. Reed spotted Choctaw's upper cabins floating off Presque Isle, Michigan, and was able to read the ship's name as he approached them. Nine days after Choctaw sank, 40 feet (12 m) of her cabin and several timbers were discovered one mile (1.6 km) north of Middle Island by the coast guard, and a lighthouse keeper.

==== Investigation ====
After Choctaw sank, Cleveland-Cliffs libeled Wahcondah, alleging that she was travelling at an excessive speed for the conditions, and should be held responsible for the collision. Choctaw's crew corroborated her owner's claims. Captain Cornelius Dineen accepted the accusation against his vessel, but claimed that Choctaw was also running at full speed, did not maintain a lookout, and accepted Wahcondah's passing signal instead of sounding her alarm and reversing. An examination of Choctaw's logbook revealed that despite the fog, she had travelled at full speed throughout the entire year, including at the time of the collision. The judge presiding over the case ruled that Choctaw and Wahcondah were both at fault. Cleveland-Cliffs appealed the decision, claiming that the judge had no right to disregard the testimony of Choctaw's crew based on the logbook details, and argued that not checking a vessel's speed in fog was not a punishable offence. They further argued that the lookout was not needed at the Choctaw's bow because of the monitor ship's high-visibility design, and that even a properly positioned lookout would have had difficulty communicating with the helmsman 200 feet (61.0 m) feet away. The court did not accept this argument, stating that:

His absence from the ordinary and proper location at the bow cannot be justified for these reasons. We find no evidence of such custom; nor is the ship’s type a sufficient excuse. The sea was smooth, and there would have been no difficulty in standing on the bow turret, and that location, seemingly, would not have been beyond calling distance for making reports.

The court eventually determined that:

There is fair probability that they might have avoided this mistake. This view leads to the conclusion that the Choctaw should be condemned for the lack of lookout, and that the damages should be divided.

Choctaw was insured for $80,200 (equivalent to $1.79 million in 2024), while her cargo was valued at $80,000 (equivalent to $1.79 million in 2024).

== Wreck ==
- Choctaw (shipwreck)
- U.S. National Register of Historic Places
- Location within Michigan Location within the United States
- Coordinates: 45°32′03″N 83°30′33″W
- NRHP reference No.: 100003214
- Added to NRHP: December 10, 2018

=== Searches ===
Choctaw was a highly sought-after shipwreck due to her unique design. Several unsuccessful attempts to locate the ship were made; several of them resulted in the discovery of one or more other wrecks. Shipwreck hunter Stan Stock conducted an independent search for Choctaw in 2003; he located the wreck of the schooner Kyle Spangler but failed to find Choctaw. Shipwreck hunters from the Thunder Bay National Marine Sanctuary collaborated with Stock in 2008 to map the wreck of Kyle Spangler. In August 2008, they partnered with the University of Rhode Island but rather than finding Choctaw, they located the wreck of the passenger steamer Messenger.

In 2011, a group consisting of expert shipwreck hunters and high school students tried to locate Choctaw. Their search effort was charted in a documentary named "Project Shiphunt". Although they failed to locate Choctaw, they found the wrecks of the steel hulled freighter Etruria, which sank on the lake after a collision with the steamer Amasa Stone, and the schooner M.F. Merrick, which sank in 1889 after a collision with the steamer Rufus P. Ranney.

=== Discovery ===
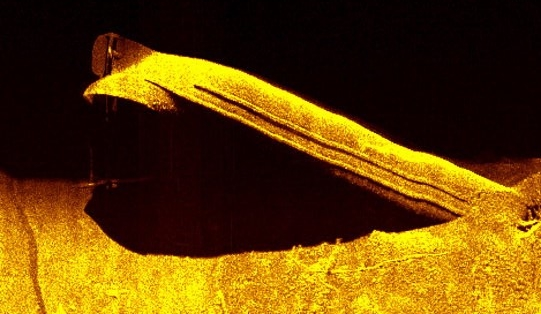
Side-scan sonar image of Choctaw

Between April and July 2017, Thunder Bay National Marine Sanctuary collaborated with the National Oceanic and Atmospheric Administration's Office of Ocean Exploration and Research to test new equipment including unmanned aircraft systems and autonomous underwater vehicles that were designed to search for missing shipwrecks. On May 23, 2017, researchers from Thunder Bay Marine Sanctuary discovered two shipwrecks in the deep waters of Lake Huron, off the coast of Presque Isle. The researchers carried out several investigations between June and August; these investigations confirmed the identities of Choctaw and the early wooden-hulled freighter Ohio. Both wrecks are in a place known as "Shipwreck Alley", which is a 448-square-mile (1,160 km^{2}) area of the Lake Huron shoreline that holds an estimated 200 shipwrecks. The US federal government named the area the nation's first National Freshwater Marine Sanctuary in 2000.

Thunder Bay National Marine Sanctuary did not announce their discovery until September 1, 2017, leading avocational shipwreck hunters to continue the search for Choctaw. On August 13, 2017, independent researcher Dan Fountain found Choctaw using a modified fishfinder. On August 20, he returned to the site with veteran shipwreck hunters Ken Merryman and Jerry Eliason to survey the wreck with Eliason's homemade high definition drop video system, positively identifying the wreck as Choctaw.

=== Choctaw today ===
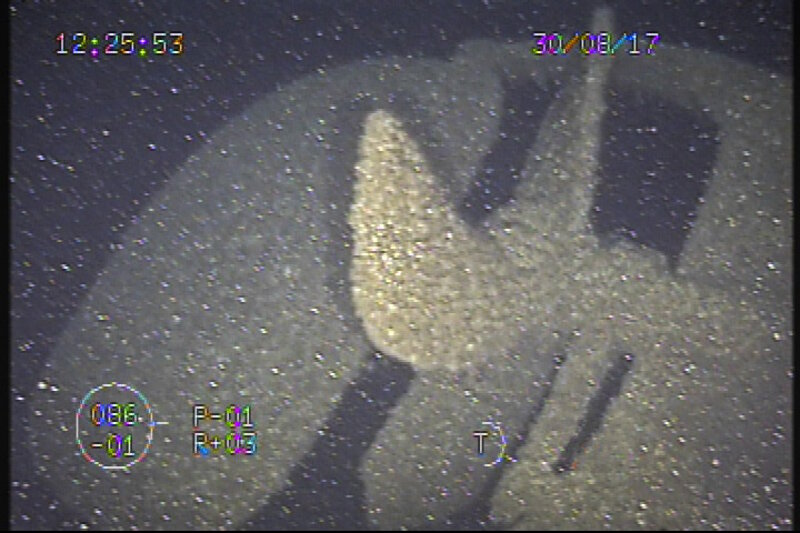
Propeller of Choctaw

The remains of Choctaw rest under 300 feet (91 m) of cold, fresh water. The wreck rests on her starboard side, nearly upside down, with the exposed section of her hull rising at an angle from the lake bottom. The upper level of her stern cabins broke away when she sank, leaving only the weather deck level cabins intact. The wreckage of her pilothouse lies beside her hull. The entire bow, including the section between the first and the second hatch where the collision occurred, is completely buried and only the last three of her seven cargo hatches remain exposed. There is a sizeable debris field surrounding her wreck, with most of the visible artefacts located near her stern.

The wreck of Choctaw was listed on the National Register of Historic Places on December 10, 2018, for its state-level significance in engineering and maritime history.

== Sources ==
- "2017 Award Program". Madison, Wisconsin: Association for Great Lakes Maritime History. 2018. Archived from the original on March 25, 2018.
- Adkins, Corey (2017). "Northern Michigan in Focus: Shipwreck Discoveries". Cadillac, Michigan: WWTV. Archived from the original on December 21, 2018.
- Ainsworth, Amber (2017). "Researchers Discover Remains of 2 Century-old Shipwrecks in Lake Huron". Detroit, Michigan: WDIV-TV. Archived from the original on January 8, 2021.
- "Andaste". Bowling Green, Ohio: Bowling Green State University. 2010. Archived from the original on January 8, 2021.
- "Andaste". Holland, Michigan: Michigan Shipwreck Research Association. 2020. Archived from the original on January 3, 2018.
- Bleck, Christie (2017). "In Lake Huron, Underwater Treasures and a Marine Sanctuary Boost Tourism Industry". Marquette, Michigan: The Mining Journal. Archived from the original on December 17, 2019.
- "Boat Was Cut in Two, Crew of Sixteen Saved". Waukegan, Illinois: Waukegan News-Sun. 1915. Archived from the original on November 26, 2021 – via Newspapers.com.
- Bowlus, W. Bruce (2010). Iron Ore Transport on the Great Lakes: The Development of a Delivery System to Feed American Industry. Jefferson, North Carolina: McFarland & Company, Inc. ISBN 978-0-786433-26-1. Archived from the original on August 14, 2021.
- Boyer, Dwight (1989) [1968]. Ghost Ships of the Great Lakes. New York City: Dodd, Mead and Company. ISBN 978-0-912514-47-5.
- Bugbee, Gordon P. (1962a). "Iron Merchant Ships: An Upper Lakes Centennial – Part One" (PDF). Detroit, Michigan: Great Lakes Maritime Institute. Archived (PDF) from the original on July 13, 2021.
- Bugbee, Gordon P. (1962b). "Iron Merchant Ships: An Upper Lakes Centennial – Part Two" (PDF). Detroit, Michigan: Great Lakes Maritime Institute. Archived (PDF) from the original on May 20, 2021.
- "Captain And Crew of Choctaw Safe". Tulsa, Oklahoma: The Tulsa Democrat. 1915. Archived from the original on November 26, 2021 – via Newspapers.com.
- "Capt. Fox's Statement". Buffalo, New York: The Buffalo Enquirer. 1915. Archived from the original on November 27, 2021 – via Newspapers.com.
- "Choctaw". Bowling Green, Ohio: Bowling Green State University. 2010. Archived from the original on January 8, 2021.
- "Choctaw (1892, Bulk Freighter)". Alpena, Michigan: Alpena County George N. Fletcher Public Library. 2020. Archived from the original on April 29, 2018.
- "Choctaw (Propeller), U126874, sunk by collision, 20 May 1896". Ontario, Canada: Maritime History of the Great Lakes. 1896. Archived from the original on January 8, 2021.
- "Choctaw (Propeller), U126874, aground, 26 May 1900". Ontario, Canada: Maritime History of the Great Lakes. 1900. Archived from the original on January 8, 2021.
- "Choctaw Shipwreck Site National Register of Historic Places Registration Form" (PDF). Washington D.C.: National Park Service. 2018. Archived from the original (PDF) on January 1, 2019.
- "Crew of Choctaw Is Safe". Sheboygan, Wisconsin: The Sheboygan Press. 1915. Archived from the original on November 26, 2021 – via Newspapers.com.
- "Crew of Choctaw Landed Safely After Ship Sinks". Detroit, Michigan: Detroit Free Press. 1915. Archived from the original on November 26, 2021 – via Newspapers.com.
- "Cool Nerve Saved Many". Escanaba, Michigan: Escanaba Morning Press. 1915. Archived from the original on November 27, 2021 – via Newspapers.com.
- Demers, L.A. (1915). "Wreck Report For the Choctaw and the Wahcondah, 1915" (PDF). London: Board of Trade. Archived (PDF) from the original on April 28, 2018.
- "Details of the Collision of the Steamers Choctaw and Wahcondah". Buffalo, New York: The Buffalo Commercial. 1915. Archived from the original on November 26, 2021 – via Newspapers.com.
- Devendorf, John F. (1996). Great Lakes Bulk Carriers, 1869–1985. Niles, Michigan: J.F. Devendorf. ISBN 978-1-889043-03-6.
- "Etruria". Washington D.C.: National Oceanic and Atmospheric Administration. 2011. Archived from the original on May 12, 2018.
- "Finding History: The Discovery of Two Lost Shipwrecks in Thunder Bay National Marine Sanctuary". Washington D.C.: National Oceanic and Atmospheric Administration. 2017. Archived from the original on March 24, 2018.
- Greenwood, John Orville (1998). The fleets of Cleveland-Cliffs, Detroit and Cleveland Navigation, Traverse City Transportation and the Hawgood Family. Grand Rapids, Michigan: Freshwater Press. ISBN 978-0-912514-57-4. Archived from the original on January 26, 2022. "The Choctaw was named for the Choctaw Indian tribe of the southern United States."
- "In Lake Huron, Underwater Treasures and a Marine Sanctuary Boost Tourism Industry". Washington D.C.: National Public Radio. 2017. Archived from the original on January 7, 2021.
- Karoub, Jeff (2017). "Two Century-old Shipwrecks Discovered in Lake Huron". Detroit, Michigan: The Detroit News. Archived from the original on November 11, 2020.
- "Kyle Spangler". Alpena, Michigan: Thunder Bay National Marine Sanctuary. 2021. Archived from the original on September 9, 2021.
- "L.C. Waldo (Propeller), U141421, collision, 20 May 1896". Ontario, Canada: Maritime History of the Great Lakes. 1896. Archived from the original on March 24, 2018.
- "Merrick, M.F. (1863, Schooner)". Alpena, Michigan: Alpena County George N. Fletcher Public Library. 2021. Archived from the original on December 18, 2021.
- "National Resister of Historic Places: Weekly List 20181210" (PDF). Washington D.C.: National Park Service. 2018. Archived from the original on December 19, 2018.
- "Pick Up Wreckage of Lost Steamer". St. Joseph, Michigan: St. Joseph Daily Press. 1915. Archived from the original on November 27, 2021 – via Newspapers.com.
- "Project Shiphunt". Washington D.C.: National Oceanic and Atmospheric Administration. 2011. Archived from the original on August 12, 2011.
- "Ranney, Rufis P. (1881, Bulk Freighter)". Alpena, Michigan: Alpena County George N. Fletcher Public Library. 2021. Archived from the original on December 18, 2021.
- "Saves Wrecked Crew-Choctaw Goes Down Before Men Can Launch Lifeboats". South Bend, Indiana: South Bend News-Times. 1915. Archived from the original on May 2, 2018 – via Library of Congress.
- "Scientific Men in Lake Ship Yards". Cleveland, Ohio: The Marine Review. 1893. Archived from the original on February 16, 2022.
- "Ship of the Month No. 96 Wahcondah". Toronto, Ontario: Toronto Marine Historical Society. 1980. Archived from the original on March 18, 2016.
- Steamboat–Inspection Service (1903). "Annual Report of the Supervising Inspector-general Steamboat-inspection Service, Year ending June 30, 1903". Washington D.C.: Government Printing Office. Archived from the original on January 24, 2021 – via HathiTrust.
- "Steamer Sinks After Collision, Crew Reaches Port". Bridgeport, Connecticut: The Bridgeport Evening Farmer. 1915. Archived from the original on April 6, 2019 – via Library of Congress.
- "Str. Choctaw Is Sent to the Bottom in a Dense Fog". Port Huron, Michigan: The Times Herald. 1915. Archived from the original on November 26, 2021 – via Newspapers.com.
- Swayze, David D. (2001). "Great Lakes Shipwrecks – C". Port Huron, Michigan: Boatnerd. Archived from the original on June 15, 2002.
- Thompson, Mark L. (2004). Graveyard of the Lakes. Great Lakes Books Series. Detroit: Wayne State University Press. ISBN 978-0-814332-26-9. Archived from the original on January 9, 2021.
- Thompson, Mark L. (1994). Queen of the Lakes. Detroit, Michigan: Wayne State University Press. ISBN 0-8143-2393-6. Archived from the original on August 14, 2021.
- "Two Historic Great Lakes Shipwrecks Discovered in Thunder Bay National Marine Sanctuary". Alpena, Michigan: Friends of the Thunder Bay National Marine Sanctuary. 2017. Archived from the original on January 13, 2019.
- "Two Historic Shipwrecks Discovered in Thunder Bay National Marine Sanctuary". Washington D.C.: National Oceanic and Atmospheric Administration. 2017. Archived from the original on December 21, 2018.
- "Two Century-old Shipwrecks Found in Lake Huron". Toronto, Ontario: The Toronto Sun. 2017. Archived from the original on February 16, 2022.
- Tuninson, John (2017). "Two Century-old Steamer Shipwrecks Discovered in Lake Huron". Grand Rapids Michigan: Mlive. Archived from the original on January 9, 2021.
- Vanderlinden, Peter J.; Bascom, John H. (1994) [1979]. Great Lakes Ships We Remember. Vol. 1. Cleveland: Freshwater Press. pp. 25–26. ISBN 978-0-912514-24-6.
- "Wrecked Crew Is Saved". Moline, Illinois: The Dispatch. 1915. Archived from the original on November 26, 2021 – via Newspapers.com.
- "Wreckage From Choctaw". Buffalo, New York: The Buffalo Commercial. 1915. Archived from the original on November 27, 2021 – via Newspapers.com.
- "Yuma". Bowling Green, Ohio: Bowling Green State University. 2010. Archived from the original on December 4, 2020.
