= SS Henry Phipps =

American Great Lakes freighter

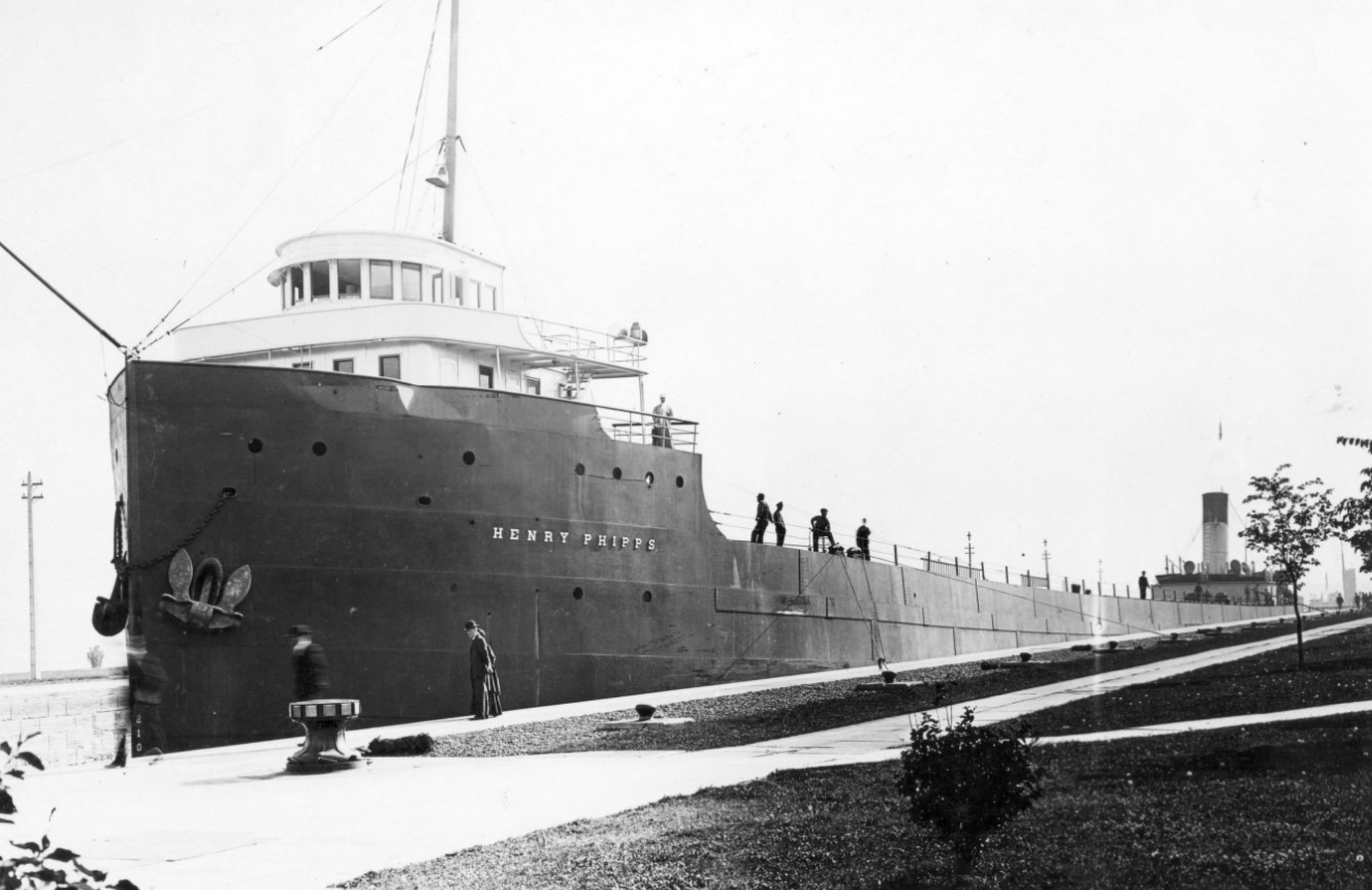
- Henry Phipps when she was owned by the Pittsburgh Steamship Company, circa 1945.

History

United States
- Name: Henry Phipps
- Operator: Pittsburgh Steamship Company 1907-1951; United States Steel Corporation 1951-1967; United States Steel Great Lakes Fleet 1967-1976
- Port of registry: United States, Duluth, Minnesota 1907-1942; Fairport, Ohio 1942-1949; Wilmington, Delaware 1949-1951; New York 1951-1967; Wilmington, Delaware 1967-1976
- Builder: West Bay City Shipbuilding Company
- Yard number: 623
- Launched: May 11, 1907
- In service: June 24, 1907
- Out of service: 1976
- Identification: U.S. Registry #204136
- Fate: Scrapped in 1976 by Hyman Michaels Company of Duluth, Minnesota

General characteristics
- Class & type: Lake freighter
- Tonnage: 7,676 Gross register tons; 6,426 net tons
- Length: 601 ft (183 m) LOA 1907-1942; 608 ft (185 m) LOA 1942-1976; 580 ft (180 m) LBP 1907-1942; 587 ft (179 m) LBP 1942-1976
- Beam: 58 ft (18 m)
- Height: 32 ft (9.8 m)
- Installed power: 2x Scotch marine boilers
- Propulsion: 2,000 horsepower (1,500 kW) triple expansion steam engine

The Henry Phipps was a 601-foot-long (183 m) American Great Lakes freighter that served on the Great Lakes of North America from her launching in 1907 to her scrapping in 1976 by Hyman Michaels Company of Duluth, Minnesota. The Phipps was used to haul bulk cargoes such as iron ore, coal, grain and occasionally limestone.

== History ==
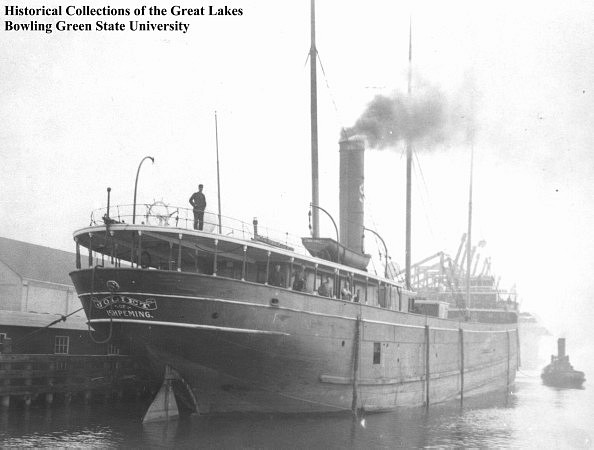
Joliet before Henry Phipps rammed her.

The Henry Phipps (official number 204136) was a product of the West Bay City Shipbuilding Company (F.W. Wheeler Shipyards) of West Bay City, Michigan. She was commissioned by the Pittsburgh Steamship Company (a subsidiary of United States Steel Corporation) of Cleveland, Ohio. She was launched on May 11, 1907 as hull number #623. She had a length of 601-feet, a beam of 58-feet and a height of 32-feet. She had a gross tonnage of 7,676 tons and a net tonnage of 6,426 tons. She was powered by a 2,000 horsepower triple expansion steam engine and fueled by two Scotch marine boilers. She entered service on June 24, 1907. In July 1907 the Phipps ran aground off Pyramid Point on Lake Michigan.

On August 13, 1909, the Phipps "sideswiped" another 600-foot long laker, the Daniel J. Morrell in heavy fog in Whitefish Bay. Both vessels sustained severe damage. The cost to repair the damage done to the Phipps was around $5,000, while the cost to repair the damage done to the Morrell was around $10,000.

On September 22, 1911 the Phipps rammed and sank the 284-foot-long (87 m) steel-hulled freighter Joliet off Port Huron, Michigan in the St. Clair River. The Joliet was anchored at the time of the collision. The crew of the Phipps couldn't see the Joliet because their vision was impaired by dense fog. The Joliet sank almost directly over the railway tunnel between Sarnia, Ontario and Port Huron.

In 1942 she was lengthened to 608 feet in length, and re registered to Fairport, Ohio. In 1946 the Phipps was rebuilt with a gross register tonnage of 7,703 tons and a net register tonnage of 6,453 tons. In 1949 the fleet owned by the Pittsburgh Steamship Company was reincorporated in Wilmington, Delaware. In 1951 the Phipps was transferred to the United States Steel Corporation of Cleveland, Ohio and re registered to New York. In 1967 the fleet was renamed United States Steel Great Lakes Fleet.

== The scrapping of the Phipps ==
In late July 1976 the Phipps was taken to a scrapping berth in Duluth, Minnesota, for scrapping by the Hyman Michaels Company. They started scrapping her in November 1976. Her enrollment was surrendered in August 1977.

== See also ==
- 1940 Armistice Day Blizzard
- Great Lakes Storm of 1913
- List of storms on the Great Lakes
- Mataafa Storm
- Largest shipwrecks on the Great Lakes
- List of shipwrecks on the Great Lakes
- SS Edmund Fitzgerald
- SS Carl D. Bradley
- SS Cedarville
- SS Chester A. Congdon
- SS James Carruthers
- SS Henry B. Smith
- SS Emperor
- SS Isaac M. Scott (1909)
- SS Charles S. Price
- SS D.M. Clemson (1903)
