= SS John Sherwin =

Two lake freighters have shared the name John Sherwin:

- SS John Sherwin (1906), U.S. propeller, bulk freighter, Official No. 202910, scrapped in 1974.
- SS John Sherwin (1958), U.S. propeller, bulk freighter, Official No. 276445, laid up in Sturgeon Bay, Wisconsin.
