= West Bay City Shipbuilding Company =

Ship building company

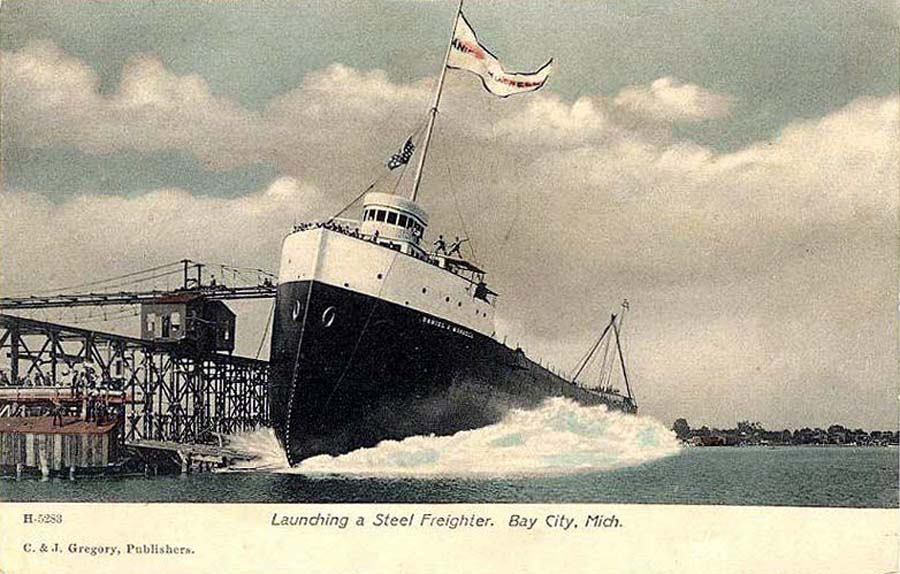
Launching of the steamer Daniel J. Morrell, possibly the most famous ship built by this yard

The West Bay City Shipbuilding Company was founded in 1876 at West Bay City, Michigan (now part of Bay City) by Frank W. Wheeler who was a ship captain on the Great Lakes, a shipbuilder and a politician. The yard started life as Wheeler & Crane. In 1880 it was renamed to F. W. Wheeler Company, and in 1889 it was renamed again to Frank W. Wheeler & Company. It was based on the Saginaw River close to Third Street. In 1899 Captain Frank W. Wheeler sold his yard to the American Ship Building Company who renamed the yard West Bay City Shipbuilding Company. The yard closed in 1908 after they built the steamer W.R. Woodford.

== Ships built ==
Ship	In service	Out of service	Length	Vessel type	Fate	Image
Mary Martini	1877	December 23, 1885	84.5 ft (25.8 m)	Cargo ship	Stranded 13 miles (21 km) east of Grand Marais, Minnesota on Brule Point. There were no deaths December 30, 1885.	
Luther Westover	1877	1903	107 ft (33 m)	Tugboat	Dismantled in 1903.	
Hanna B	1879	1902	95.5 ft (29.1 m)	Barge	Sank near Christian Island, Georgian Bay	
Charles W. Liken	1880	August 13, 1905	63 ft (19 m)	Tugboat	Burned to a total loss in Bay City, Michigan.	
Lycoming	1880	October 22, 1910	251 ft (77 m)	Cargo ship	Burned to the waterline off Rondeau, Ontario, Lake Erie October 22, 1910.	
Conemaugh	1880	November 21, 1906	251 ft (77 m)	Cargo ship	Stranded on Point Pelee on Lake Erie. There were no deaths November 21, 1906.	
Maud S	1881	May 1, 1890	54.42 ft (16.59 m)	Tugboat	Endorsed to inland waters.	
Saginaw Valley	1881	1926	161 ft (49 m)	Lake freighter	Sunk in Port Dalhousie, Ontario for a rifle range and later broken up.	
Fred McBrier	1881	October 3, 1890	161 ft (49 m)	Lake freighter	Sank in a collision with the steamer Progress in the Straits of Mackinac October 3, 1890.	
Galatea	1882	October 20, 1905	180 ft (55 m)	Schooner	Stranded in Grand Marais, Michigan with the schooner Nirvana. There were no deaths October 20, 1905.	
Osceola	1882	December 7, 1906	183.42 ft (55.91 m)	Lake freighter	Stranded on Michipicoten Island on Lake Superior December 7, 1906.	
Sarah Smith	1883	August 18, 1908	75 ft (23 m)	Tugboat	Caught fire off Minnesota Point and burned to a total loss August 18, 1908.	
W. H. Gilbert	1892	May 22, 1914	328 ft (100 m)	Lake freighter	Sank in a collision on Lake Huron on May 22, 1914.	
Etruria	1902	June 18, 1905	434 ft (132 m)	Lake freighter	Sank on Lake Huron following a collision with Amasa Stone June 18, 1905.	
Bransford	1902	1974	434 ft (132 m)	Lake freighter	Converted to a crane ship in 1943. Scrapped in Bilbao, Spain in 1974.	
Daniel J. Morrell	1906	November 29, 1966	603 ft (184 m)	Lake freighter	Broke up and sunk during a storm. 28 of 29 crew died November 29, 1966.	
John Sherwin	1906	June 1970	534 ft (163 m)	Lake freighter	Scuttled as a temporary breakwater at Nanticoke, Ontario in 1970, then sold to German shipbreakers in 1974.	
