= SS Henry Steinbrenner =

Dry bulk freighter on the Great Lakes

Coordinates: 47.744°N 88.750°W

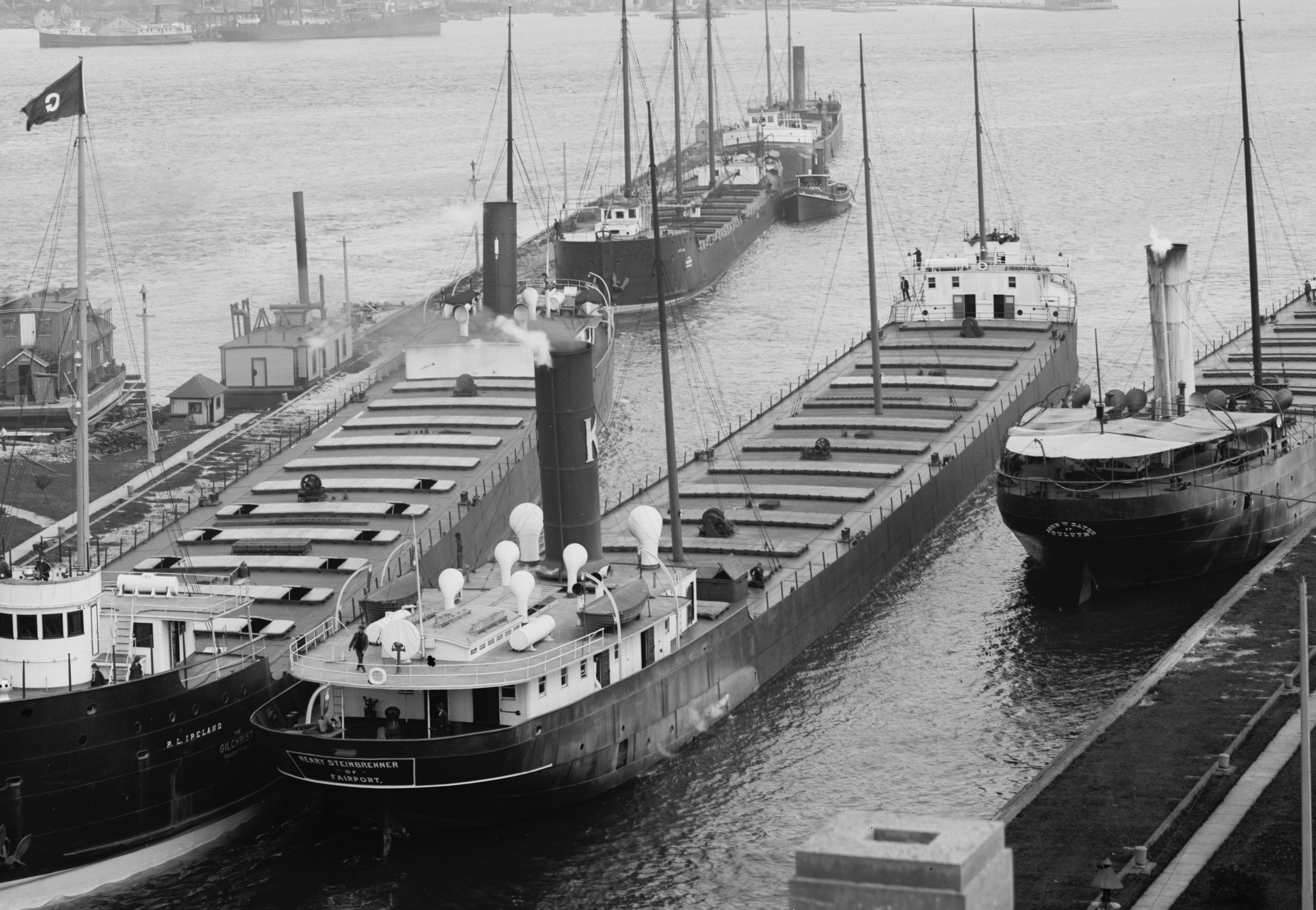
- Henry Steinbrenner, center, at Soo Locks, c. 1905

History

United States
- Name: Henry Steinbrenner
- Namesake: Great Grandfather of former New York Yankees owner George Steinbrenner
- Owner: Kinsman Transit Co., Cleveland, Ohio
- Operator: Kinsman Transit Co., Cleveland, Ohio
- Port of registry: United States
- Builder: Jenks Ship Building Co. Port Huron, Michigan
- Launched: September 28, 1901
- Identification: US 96584
- Fate: Lost in a storm on May 11, 1953; wreck found September 2023

General characteristics
- Class & type: Lake freighter Straight Deck
- Tonnage: 4719 tons
- Length: 427 ft (130 m)
- Beam: 50 ft (15 m)
- Depth: 28 ft (8.5 m)
- Installed power: Scotch marine boilers
- Propulsion: triple expansion engine; single fixed pitch propeller.
- Speed: 12 knots (22 km/h; 14 mph)
- Capacity: ~6500 tons
- Crew: 30

The lake freighter SS Henry Steinbrenner was a 427-foot (130 m) long, 50-foot (15 m) wide, and 28-foot (8.5 m) deep, dry bulk freighter of typical construction style for the early 1900s, primarily designed for the iron ore, coal, and grain trades on the Great Lakes. Commissioned by the Kinsman Transit Co. of Cleveland, Ohio she was launched as hull number 14 by Jenks Ship Building Co. of Port Huron, Michigan. Her design featured a forward forecastle containing crew cabins topped with an additional cabin and pilot house. The mid section was a long nearly flat deck over the cargo holds only interrupted by 12 hatches fitted with telescoping type hatch covers. The aft end featured a large cabin situated over the engine room containing the galley, mess rooms, and crew quarters and was topped with a smoke stack and air vents. The Steinbrenner later featured a "doghouse" cabin aft of her smoke stack to house added crew from a change in the crew watch system on the Great Lakes. (Note: Note: there were four vessels named "Henry Steinbrenner." The original Henry Stenbrenner was built for Kinsman in 1901 and carried that name for her entire career. That career ended tragically on May 11, 1953 when she sank in a storm on Lake Superior with the loss of 17 of her crew. The second Henry Steinbrenner was originally the Verona of the Pickands-Mather fleet when she was built in 1907. She was sold to Kinsman and renamed Henry Steinbrenner in 1957. She was briefly renamed Uhlmann Brothers in 1965 before being sold to Norlake Shipping and renamed Manitoba. She was scrapped in England in 1969. The third Henry Steinbrenner was built as the Pittsburgh Steamship Company's George F. Baker, also in 1907. Kinsman acquired her in 1965, and operated her as the Henry Steinbrenner until 1979 when she was scrapped in Ashtabula, Ohio. The fourth and final Henry Steinbrenner was also a former Pittsburgh boat, built in 1916 as the William A. McGonagle. Kinsman bought the McGonagle in 1979, but kept her original name until 1986 when she was renamed Henry Steinbrenner. She sailed through the 1989 season and was laid up in Toledo. At that time she was the last coal-fired straight-decker on the Great Lakes, and the last of the "Standard 600-footers" in unmodified form. She was scrapped in Port Maitland, Ontario in 1994.)

== Career ==
The Steinbrenner had an eventful first two decades on the Great Lakes. On December 6, 1909 the Steinbrenner was downbound loaded with iron ore when she was involved in a collision on St. Marys River with the nearly new SS Harry A. Berwind. The Steinbrenner sank in the river and was declared a total constructive loss, but was recovered on May 10, 1910, repaired and returned to service. She would resume a rather uneventful pattern of trading until she once again collided with another ship. This time she struck the SS John McCartney Kennedy in a foggy Whitefish Bay but managed to stay afloat. After US$5000 in repairs, she once again resumed trading.

== Final voyage ==
At 5:11 AM on May 10, 1953, the 52-year-old ship left Superior, Wisconsin, with nearly 7000 tons of iron ore for the steel mills on Lake Erie. Weather conditions were good at the time but forecasts called for rougher weather later in the day. Leaving despite unfavorable forecasts wasn't rare for captains of this time. Weather reports were less accurate than modern forecasts and most captains and crews had endured several storms during their careers.

Later that afternoon the Steinbrenner met with the forecast gale as strong winds and large waves buffeted the vessel. Although he secured his ship's deck, Captain Albert Stiglin did not have his crew place tarpaulins on the twelve leaf-type "Telescoping" hatch covers; since these were not watertight, they allowed some water to seep into the cargo holds. Around 8 pm one of the leaves on the number 11 hatch worked loose and allowed water to pour into the hold. Crew members were dispatched to secure the cover but, as the storm intensified, 80-mile-per-hour (129 km/h) winds and large waves worked the leaf loose again. Complicating the issue, doors and vents were being forced open by the storm. Conditions were now too treacherous to send crews out on deck. Pumps were started but the flooding continued. Captain Stiglin tried to keep the waves from causing more damage but by morning other hatch covers had worked loose and the ship staggered to make headway. After a few more maneuvers it became all too apparent that the ship was doomed. Shortly after 7:00 AM on May 11, 1953, an SOS was broadcast. At 7:35 AM, an abandon ship signal was blown on the whistle and the crew mustered at the forward life raft, and the aft lifeboats. As the ship settled in the water, confusion took hold and several men ended up in the water or were injured. The vessel sank quickly, stern first, 15 nautical miles (28 km; 17 mi) south of Isle Royale Light. Alerted by the SOS, the steamers Wilfred Sykes, Joseph H. Thompson (then the largest ship on the lakes), D.M. Clemson, D.G. Kerr, William E. Corey, and the Canadian ship Hochelaga, conducted a search for survivors. The Joseph H. Thompson, under the command of Captain Robert F. Leng, found the life raft and six men taking refuge in it. The D.M. Clemson, under the command of Captain Arthur M. Everett, found one life boat. In heavy winds and rough seas, Captain Everett carefully maneuvered the Clemson to put the lifeboat in the ship's lee and then had the survivors lifted aboard with ropes. The men were then taken to the Captain's quarters where they were given warm food and dry clothes. The Wilfred Sykes rescued the men of the other life boat.

== Aftermath ==
In the end, 17 men were lost in the tragedy. Fingers were pointed at the crew for not using the tarpaulins on the hatches, but in a storm of that magnitude even the tarpaulins may not have been enough to keep the Henry Steinbrenner afloat. The loss of the Steinbrenner solidified the move by Great Lakes vessel operators to retrofit some of their older vessels with watertight single piece hatch covers during rebuilds. Examples of ships that saw this work included the SS L.E. Block, SS Willis B Boyer, and the SS George W. Perkins.

Norm Bragg, who survived this wreck in Lake Superior, was a watchman on board the SS Daniel J. Morrell when it sank in Lake Huron. He helped his crew understand their plight, gave quick advice and said, "It's been good to know you."

Her wreck was located in 2023, in 750 feet (230 m) of water.

== See also ==
- SS Edmund Fitzgerald
