= Kyle Spangler (schooner) Shipwreck Site =

Shipwreck in Lake Huron, US

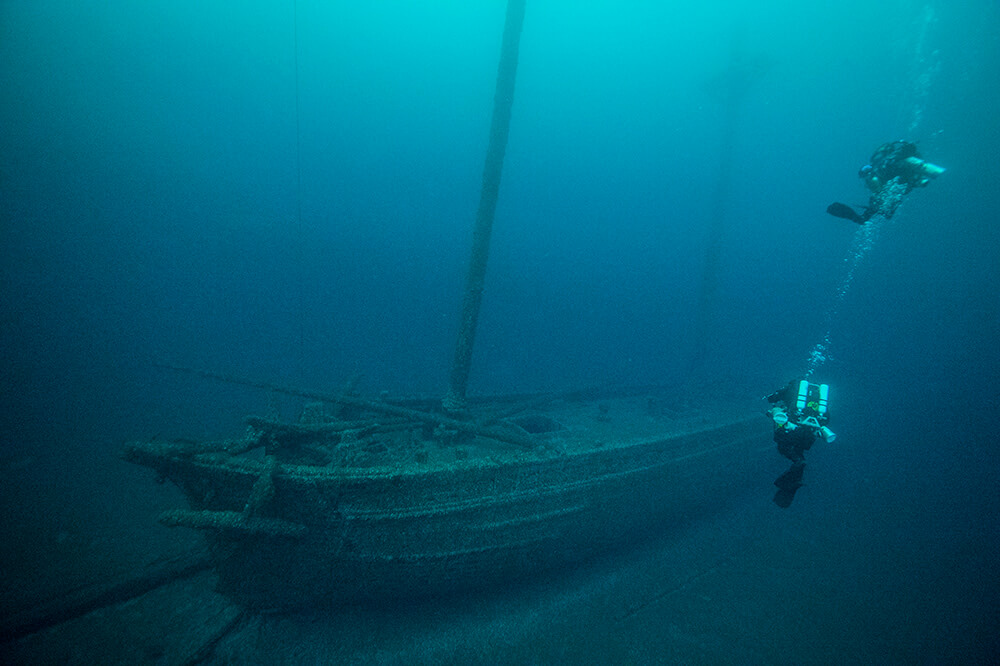
- Kyle Spangler wreck

History

United States
- Name: Kyle Spangler
- Operator: B. L. Spangler Co.
- Builder: William Jones
- Launched: May 12, 1856
- Completed: 1856
- Fate: Sunk in collision November 5, 1860

General characteristics
- Tonnage: 349 tons
- Length: 130 ft (40 m)
- Beam: 26 ft (7.9 m)
- Depth: 11 ft (3.4 m)
- Decks: 1
- KYLE SPANGLER (schooner) Shipwreck Site
- U.S. National Register of Historic Places
- Location within Michigan Location within the United States
- Location: Lake Huron, 4 miles (6.4 km) northeast of Presque Isle
- Coordinates: 45°23′1″N 83°26′7″W
- Built by: William Jones
- Architectural style: shipwreck site
- NRHP reference No.: 14001098
- Added to NRHP: August 22, 2016

Kyle Spangler was a wooden schooner; its 1860 wreck site in Lake Huron was listed on the National Register of Historic Places in 2016.

== History ==
Basil L. Spangler, born in 1817, was a dry-goods merchant from Cleveland who ran his own form, B. L. Spangler and Company. In 1856, Spangler commissioned William Jones, a shipbuilder from Black River Ohio (now Lorain), to construct a schooner. The schooner was named Kyle Spangler, after Spangler's son, born in 1851. The ship was launched on May 12, 1856, and departed Cleveland with a cargo of coal two days later.

The Kyle Spangler was a traditional mid-nineteenth century cargo schooner that hauled various cargoes on the freshwater Great Lakes, and on to saltwater ports along the east coast. including iron ore, salt, coal, corn and wheat.

Like many schooners of the time, the Kyle Spangler endured a series of shipping incidents. In May 1856 she tore a hole in her bottom on a reef in Lake Huron. In 1857, she spring a leak in Lake Michigan, and was run aground just south of Sleeping Bear Bay before she sank. It was almost a year before she was refloated. The ship was dismasted in 1858, and later that same year collided with another schooner in the Straits of Mackinac. In 1859, the Kyle Spangler sailed into the Atlantic Ocean with a load of lumber and returned the following spring.

On November 5, 1860, while upbound on Lake Huron on a dark night with a load of corn, the Kyle Spangler collided with the downbound schooner Racine, crushing the Kyle Spangler's bow and sinking her. All crewmen were rescued safely.

== The wreck ==
The wreck was discovered in 2003 by divers while searching for the semi-whaleback freighter Choctaw. Over the next few years, Stock and a team from the National Oceanic and Atmospheric Administration’s Thunder Bay National Marine Sanctuary documented the wreck. In 2008, it was decided to release the location of the wreck to the general public, and the location has become a popular scuba diving attraction.

The Kyle Spangler lies upright in 185 feet (56 meters) of water, and much of the wreck is undamaged save the bow. The cold, fresh water of Lake Huron has kept the wreck well preserved, and the ship looks much as she did during the 1850s, with both masts (including crosstrees) intact and upright. The wreck lists twenty degrees to the starboard side.

The ship's wheel, steering gear and rudder are intact, as are two bilge pumps and the main winch and capstan. The interior cabin structure is relatively intact, but the woodwork has collapsed, making small items difficult to discern. The cargo hold hatch covers are displaced, giving easy access to the hold.

== Images ==
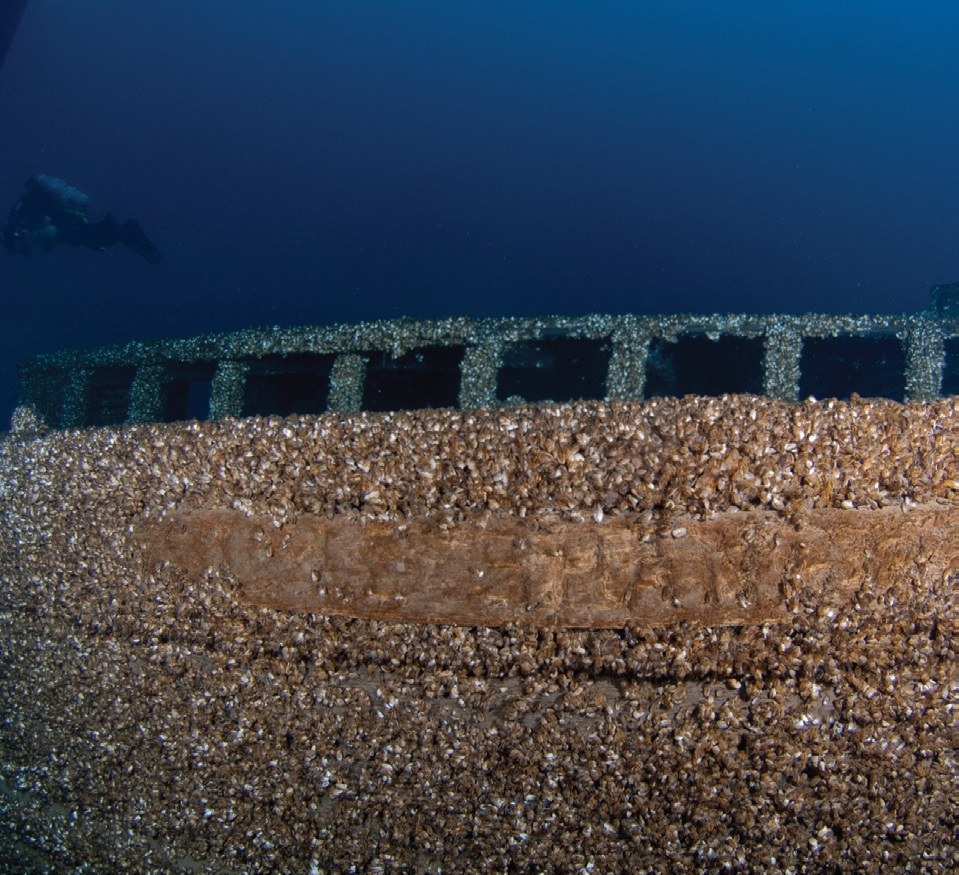
Kyle Spangler nameboard

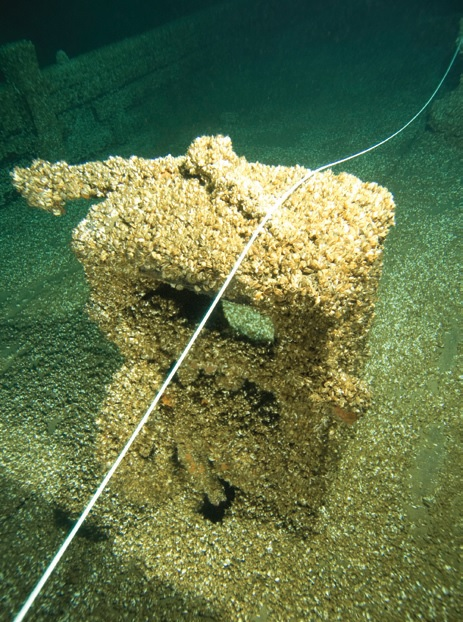
Winch

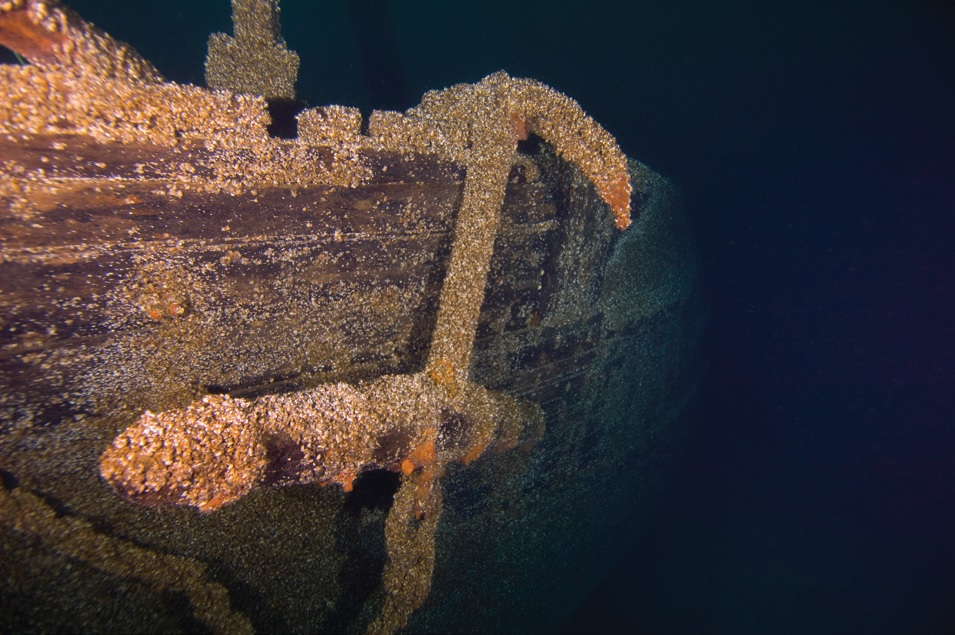
Anchor

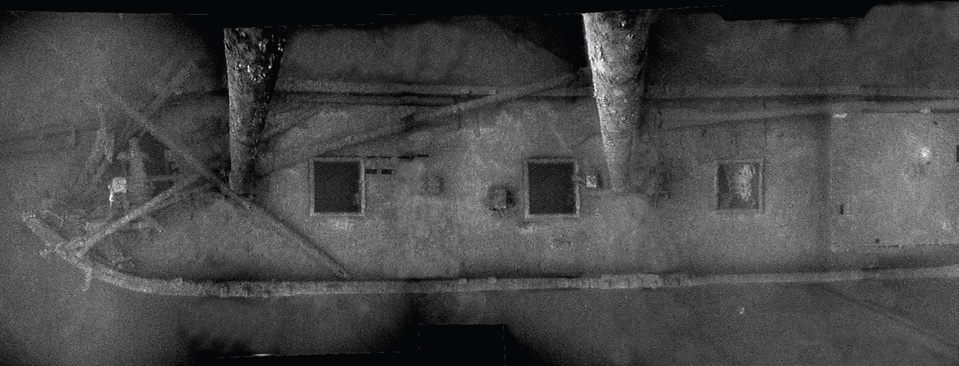
Kyle Spangler photomosaic
