= SS Andaste =

Ship wrecked in Lake Michigan in 1929

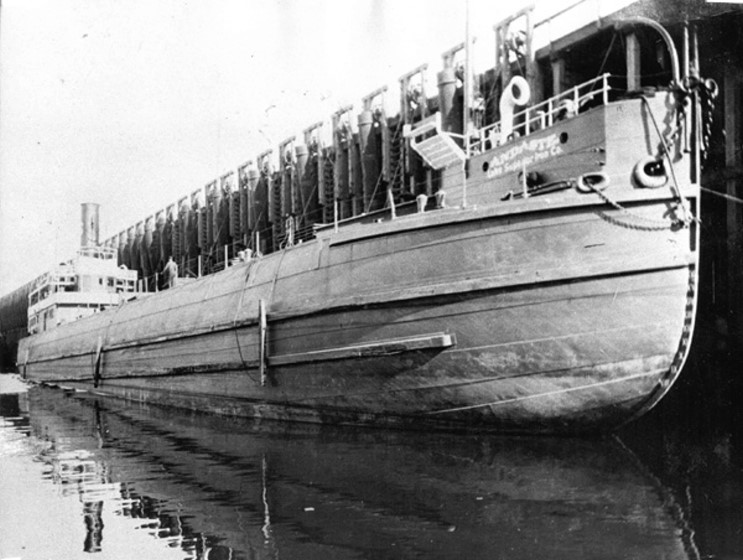
- SS Andaste in port, c. 1900

History

United States
- Name: Andaste
- Namesake: Andaste, a French name for the Susquehannock people (from Wyandot Andastoerrhonon)
- Builder: Cleveland Shipbuilding Company
- Laid down: 1892
- Fate: Sank 9–10 September 1929

General characteristics
- Length: 266.9 ft (81.4 m)
- Beam: 38.1 ft (11.6 m)
- Depth: 17.9 ft (5.5 m)
- Propulsion: Triple expansion
- Notes: Official number US 106929

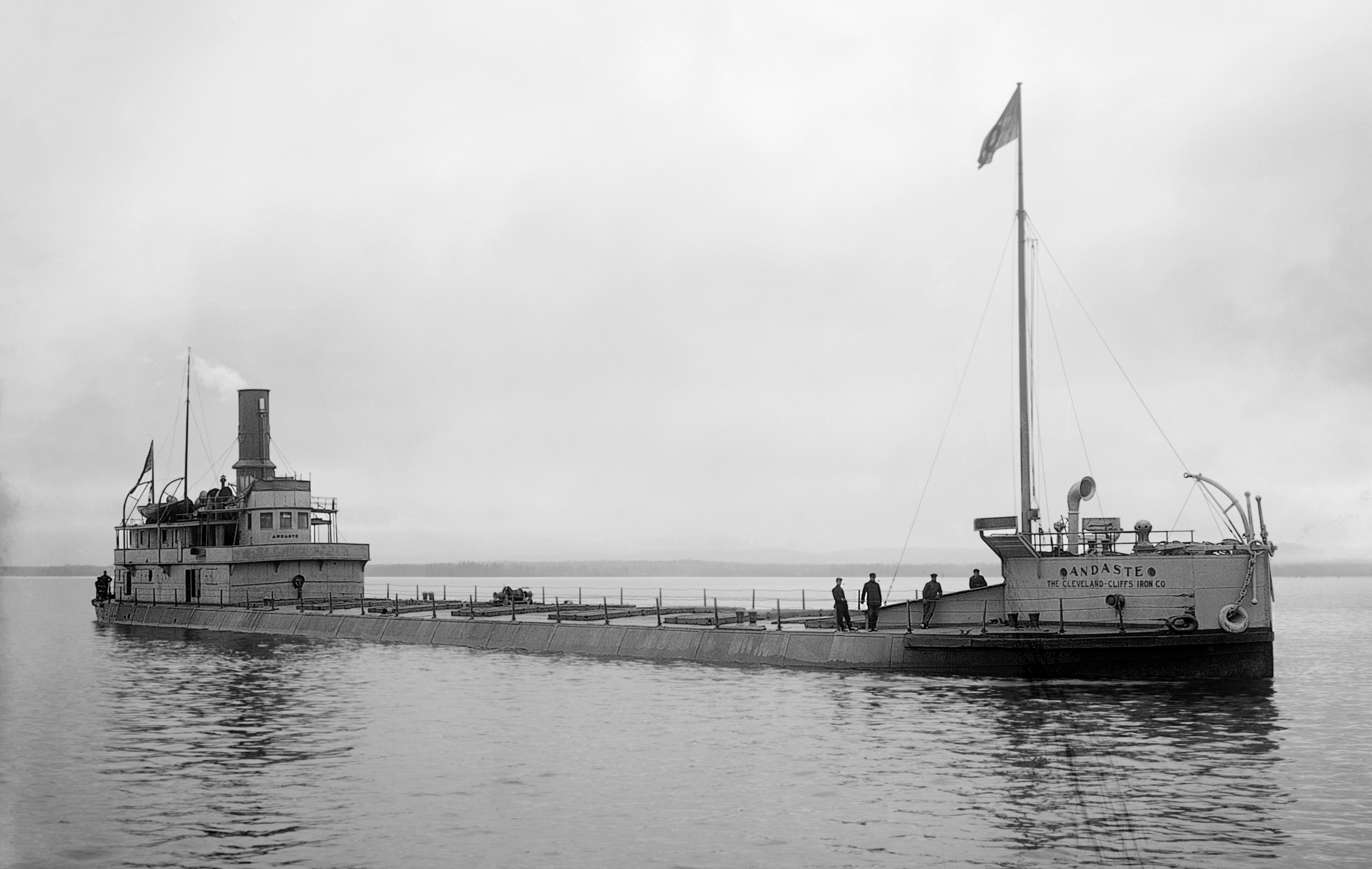
SS Andaste fully loaded, c. 1910

The SS Andaste was a Monitor-class vessel, built in 1892 by the Cleveland Ship Building Company for the Lake Superior Iron Company. The vessel is best known for sinking on Lake Michigan on the night of September 9–10, 1929, with all hands; 25 men were lost. As of 2025, the wreck of Andaste has not yet been located.

== History ==
Andaste was built by the Cleveland Shipbuilding Company and launched on March 31, 1892. She was 266.9 feet (81.4 m) long with a 38.1-foot (11.6 m) beam and 17.9 feet (5.5 m) depth (hold and water bottom). She had a cutaway stern, seven deck hatches, and no interior bulkheads between the forward collision bulkhead and the engine bulkhead in the rear. She could carry 2,800 short tons (2,500 t) fully loaded, at which time she would draw 16 feet (4.9 m). She was originally built for the Lake Superior Iron Company in 1892, but the Cleveland-Cliffs Iron Company became her owner after the original owner went into bankruptcy in 1898.

Andaste, and her sister ship Choctaw, had an unusual design. They were straight-back steel freighters, similar to whalebacks, but they had straight sides and a conventional bow. This combination meant that from the waterline upward, their sides sloped inboard in a "tumble-home" configuration. They were a hybrid called "semi-whalebacks" (Note: "The steamers Andaste and Choctaw were both built by the Cleveland Shipbuilding Company on the banks of the Cuyahoga River in 1892. Their unique design often has been described as a "semi-whaleback," straight-back steel freighters similar to a whaleback but with straight sides and a conventional bow. Both were 266 feet long with 900 horsepower engines and a capacity of 3,000 tons of ore. They plied the Lake Superior iron trade, running between northern ore docks and southern steel mills without incident until the parent company went bankrupt in 1898 and soon after were acquired by the Cleveland Cliffs Iron Company.") and like the true whalebacks, they were vulnerable to getting a wet deck in storm or gale conditions. In 1898 Andaste and Choctaw were transferred from Lake Superior Iron to the Cleveland Cliffs Co. The vessels carried coal, iron ore, and grain to and from Lake Superior to the lower Great Lakes. Choctaw sank in 1915 as the result of a marine collision in Lake Huron, leaving Andaste as a unique vessel without any sister ships. (Note: Because of their unconventional design, Andaste and her sister were considered to be ugly ships.)

=== Refits ===
The vessel received new boilers in 1906.

In the winter of 1920–1921, Andaste (then owned by the Cleveland Cliffs Iron Co.) was delivered to the Great Lakes Engineering Works for a major refit. She was shortened from 266 feet in length to 246 feet. Her new "canaller" dimensions made it possible for her to operate in the Welland Canal and St. Lawrence River. Despite this refit, the vessel was rapidly becoming superannuated. Her age and unique dimensions made her superfluous within the Great Lakes bulk-carriage shipping industry.

In 1925 Andaste was steered to Sturgeon Bay, Wisconsin, for a second refit. This second refit was carried out under the supervision of her new owners, Cliffs-L.D. Smith Steamship Company. This rebuild was meant to help the aging vessel transport crushed stone and stone aggregate, and a self-unloading crane and related apparatus were refitted onto the ship's hull and frame. The Smith-patented tunnel scrapers were intended to enable the ship to unload more quickly, and to partially offload at ports that could not previously be serviced by a bulk carrier. Although the Leatham Smith self-unloading apparatus made economic sense, the topside gear appears to have had negative effects upon the metacentric stability of the vessels that took on the new machinery. Four of the refitted ships were lost in relatively quick progression.

=== Sinking ===
During the 1920s, there was a dramatic upsurge in demand by local governments and road districts for gravel, sand, and cement. Outdoor construction materials were in high demand to build concrete-paved roads and highways for motor cars. This demand created a new lease on life for the old Andaste. Starting in 1928, the aging "canaller" was chartered to the Construction Materials Company of Chicago as a shuttle boat for aggregate construction materials. The Company's dock and concrete plant, on the Calumet River in South Chicago, always needed more aggregate. In addition, the Company had been hired as a contractor to the City of Chicago, which was building a broad parkway along its shoreline that required hundreds of thousands of tons of landfill sand. The parkway that Andaste was helping to build would become Chicago's Lake Shore Drive. Although Andaste was itself owned by Cleveland interests, the vessel rarely left the sand-and-gravel-rich basin of Lake Michigan.

As a shuttle boat, Andaste was commanded by Captain Albert L. Anderson of Sturgeon Bay. A glacier-deposited mound of sand and gravel on the banks of the Grand River, at what is now the Bass River State Recreation Area twelve miles southeast of Grand Haven, yielded a steady stream of aggregate loads bound for Chicago. On September 9, 1929, Andaste lay alongside a Grand River dock, taking on another 2,000-ton load of Grand River aggregate. Few noticed the workaday vessel, as she was a constant presence at working port quays like this one. Late that evening she cast off and headed for Chicago. The boat was logged by the Coast Guard as passing through the Grand Haven harbor piers at 9:03 p.m. This brief notation in an official log book is the last verified sighting of Andaste.

About one hour after Andaste departed Grand Haven, a stiff wind sprang up. Gale warnings were posted, but too late for Andaste to see or hear them, as the vessel had no radio. The storm continued to develop, producing wind of 60 miles per hour (100 km/h) by 1 a.m. the morning of Tuesday, September 10. The captain and first officer of another vessel out in Lake Michigan, SS Alabama, later testified to the wind's force and fury. In this gale Andaste disappeared and was never seen again. Although the vessel had been due in Chicago on the morning of Tuesday, the 10th, Andaste did not make harbor at the Calumet River or in any other port. Searches for the lost vessel on September 11 found nothing. Further search efforts on September 12 uncovered a large quantity of wreckage. A "vast floating field of wreckage" was seen that afternoon southwest of Holland, a Lake Michigan port downbound from Andaste's Grand Haven departure point. The wreckage included a cabin door and hatch strongbacks that were identified by former Andaste seamen as having come from the lost vessel.

On September 13, the Associated Press distributed the story to its member newspapers: "Wreckage of Andaste Found – Believe Crew Lost. No Trace Found of 26 [sic] On Ship."

== Inquiry ==
Among the missing was 14-year-old Earl Zietlow, a steward's assistant on his first voyage who performed tasks such as helping out in the ship's galley; he was last seen peeling potatoes. The bodies of 16 of the 25 men aboard were recovered. Their remains washed ashore with the surf along a stretch of Michigan beach from Holland north to Grand Haven. Evidence that the men knew their ship had been in danger is shown by 11 of the 16 bodies wearing life jackets.

=== Coroner's jury ===
Additional evidence that the boat's men had known they had been in trouble was presented to the county coroner. Men searching the Ottawa County beaches for bodies found a bobbing, splintered plank or piece of board siding. On the wood was written, with pencil, a note: "Worst storm I have ever been in. Can’t stay up much longer. Hope to God we are saved. A.L.A." Albert L. Anderson was the ship's captain. The note was treated as evidence by many, and deprecated by others. Skeptics said that the ship's master, a man with forty years' experience on the Great Lakes (and thirty of them with captain's papers), would have been likely to try to write down the exact time the note was written, the condition of the boat at the time of writing, and the location of the boat as it labored through its final moments. In any case, the coroner's inquiry into the vessel's sinking – which would have very much liked to have had this information – did not have it. At the inquest, held September 24 in Grand Haven, the coroner's jury was forced to conclude that the lost boat had sunk for unknown reasons at an unknown location.

=== Cause of sinking ===
Speculations, with which the coroner's jury did not agree or disagree, were presented to the inquiry on the possible condition of the vessel prior to its foundering. The life-jacketed corpses that washed ashore south of Grand Haven were seen by some as a sign that the doomed vessel had fallen into what is called the "trough" of the gale waves. This is a condition when a boat, often a boat with impaired metacentric functions, cannot recover after being hit broadside by a breaking wave. Partly swamped, the rolling boat falls down in the wave troughs and does not rise with the wave crests. Questions were raised, at the inquiry and later, about the metacentric stability of Andaste with its topside self-unloading machinery. Great Lakes seamen were aware that a structurally similar (although not identical) aggregate freighter, Clifton, had been refitted with similar topside self-unloading machinery and had disappeared with all hands on Lake Huron in September 1924. A similar retrofit and sinking involved Hennepin.

The corpse of the lost Andaste's first mate, Charles Brown, was found wearing high rubber boots. The footwear was seen by some as a sign that the vessel was prone to shifting its cargo of aggregate in bad weather, and that the doomed ship's officer may have had to dress himself for the frantic task of shoveling gravel uphill inside a wet ship's hold. As of September 1929, there was no way to confirm or deny this speculation.

After issuing its verdict, the coroner's jury added three additional points on matters of overall Great Lakes marine policy. Its members, who were businessmen of Holland with an interest in Lake Michigan safety, issued three unofficial recommendations to the shipping industry.

=== Coroner's jury recommendations ===
- That all large vessels operating on the Great Lakes be equipped with a radio apparatus.
- That five central marine offices be established, one for each of the Great Lakes, to officially report missing vessels.
- That proper facilities be maintained on each of the five Great Lakes for immediate searches and rescues.

== Legacy ==
The Ottawa County coroner's jury recommendations with respect to Andaste, although they had no official standing, were taken seriously by the Lake Carriers Association (the trade association of Great Lakes commercial shipowners) and by the U.S. Coast Guard. Pressure rose on Congress to take action, and the national legislature responded by funding a small fleet of six U.S. Coast Guard cutters for deployment at various spots along the Great Lakes shoreline. The cutter assigned to Grand Haven, USCGC Escanaba, entered service in November 1932. Meanwhile, commercial shipowners were taking steps to furnish each of their vessels with a radio apparatus. The impact of these deployments could be seen throughout the 1930s and 1940s, decades in which there was a sharp reduction in shipping disasters on the Great Lakes.

Starting in December 2006, the Michigan Shipwreck Research Association (MSRA) has expressed a public desire that Andaste be found. In response to its appeal, the MSRA has been able to collect key artifacts of the lost vessel, salvaged by rescue workers and beachcombers immediately after the tragedy. An original name board, bearing the name "Andaste", turned up in 2010. The MSRA has also continued the search for the hull of Andaste, which lies somewhere in the bed of Lake Michigan. MSRA board director Valerie van Heest told a reporter in 2016 that the 1929 inquest, particularly the testimony of Alabama senior officers, contains valuable clues that may help the organization succeed in uncovering the missing ship's hull. Yet "as with all missing ships," the Association's webpage concludes, "the Andaste may never be found."

Andaste's last voyage, her departure from Grand Haven, and her legacy of support for the U.S. Coast Guard are commemorated in State of Michigan historical marker L1831, which has been erected on the Grand Haven harborfront. Built on sand and gravel that Andaste had helped to carry, Chicago's Lake Shore Drive is used by tens of thousands of motor vehicles daily.

The Michigan Shipwreck Research Association still lists Andaste as missing. The Association says: "As with all missing ships, Andaste may never be found. However, with today’s side scan sonar and other electronic search equipment, the secrets of 'ships gone missing' may someday be uncovered."
