= SS Edward Y. Townsend =

Great Lakes freighter

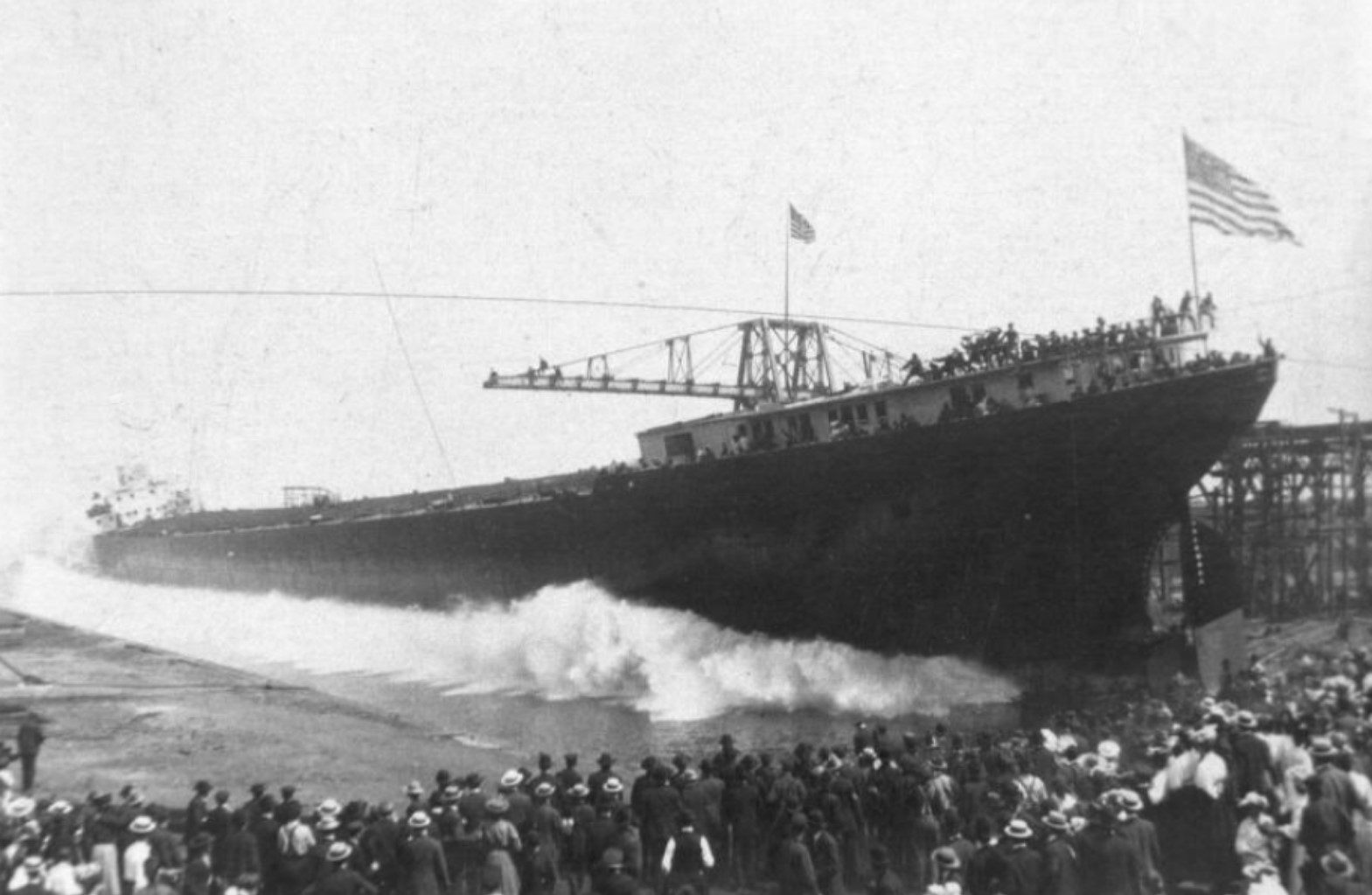
- Launch of Edward Y. Townsend

History
- Name: Edward Y. Townsend
- Operator: Cambria Steamship Company (M.A. Hanna Company, Mgrs.) 1906–1926; Cambria Steamship Company 1927–1929; Cambria Steamship Company (Bethlehem Transportation Company, Mgrs.) 1930–1968
- Port of registry: (United States) Wilmington, Delaware
- Builder: Superior Shipbuilding Company
- Yard number: 515
- Launched: 18 August 1906
- Completed: 1906
- In service: 1906
- Out of service: 1968
- Identification: U.S. Registry #203449
- Fate: Sunk on the way to the scrapper on 7 October 1968
- Notes: She was the sister ship of the ill-fated Daniel J. Morrell

General characteristics
- Class & type: Bulk freighter
- Tonnage: 7,438 GRT; 5,673 NRT
- Length: 603 ft (184 m)
- Beam: 58 ft (18 m)
- Height: 32 ft (9.8 m)
- Installed power: 2 x Scotch marine boilers
- Propulsion: 1,800 hp (1,300 kW) triple expansion steam engine attached to a single fixed pitch propeller
- Speed: 10 knots (19 km/h; 12 mph)
- Crew: 29

SS Edward Y. Townsend (official number 203449) was a 603-foot (184 m) American Great Lakes freighter that served on the Great Lakes. She was primarily used to haul bulk cargoes such as iron ore, coal, grain and occasionally limestone. She was in service from her launching in 1906 to her sinking in 1968. She is best known for sinking on the way to the scrapper, near RMS Titanic, off the coast of Newfoundland.

== History ==
Edward Y. Townsend was built in 1906 by the Superior Shipbuilding Company, of Superior, Wisconsin, for the Cambria Steamship Company of Cleveland, Ohio. She was the longest vessel at the time of her launch, therefore she was given the title 'Queen of the Lakes'. She began service in September 1906.

On April 26, 1909, Edward Y. Townsend collided with the steamer Philip Minch off Whitefish Point, Lake Superior sustaining minor damage. Low water levels on February 1 through February 6, 1926, caused Edward Y. Townsend to run aground near Buffalo, New York.

== SS Daniel J. Morrell ==
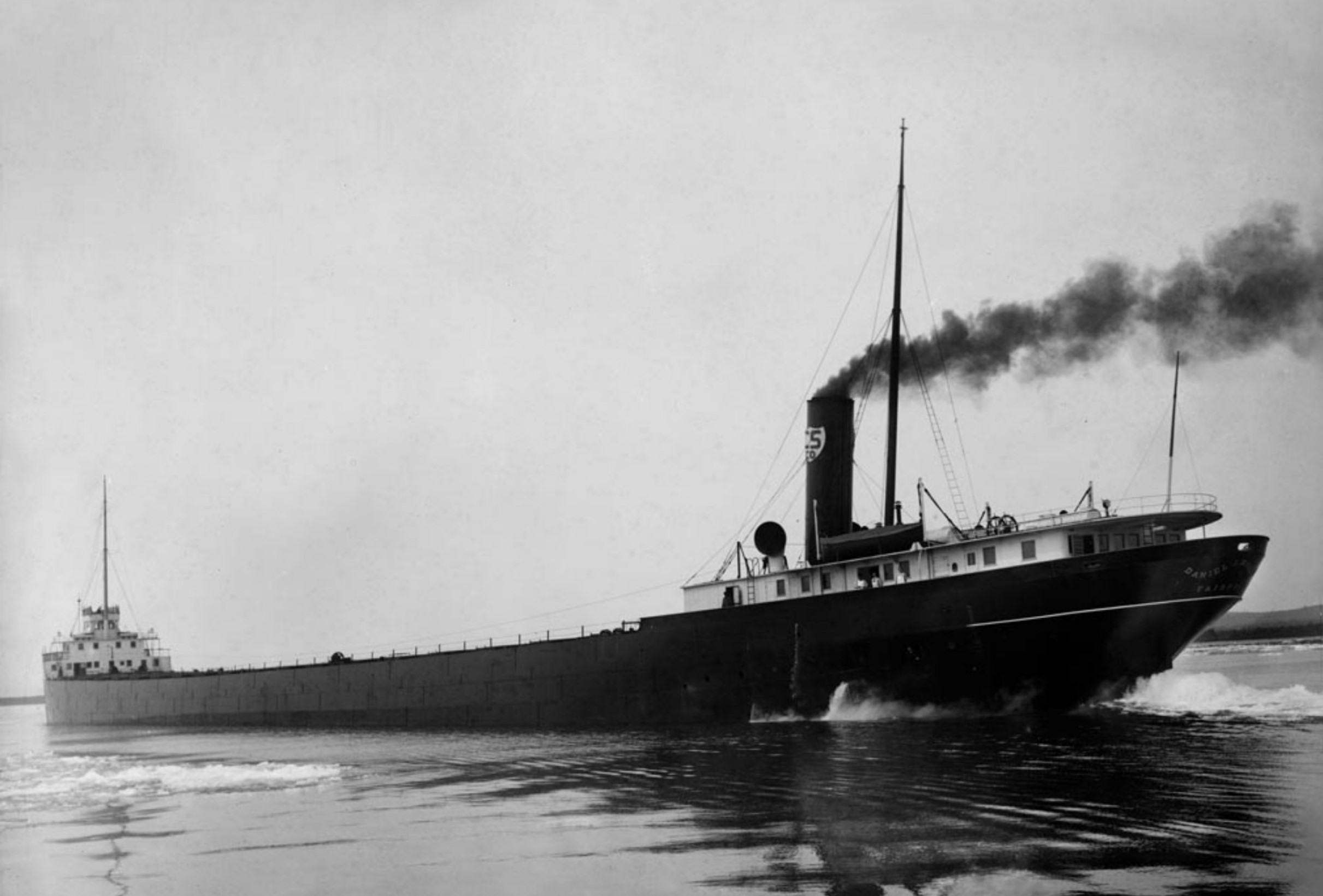
Daniel J. Morrell showing her Cambria Steamship Company smokestack

Even though Edward Y. Townsend was built by a different shipbuilding company than Daniel J. Morrell they were considered sister ships, because they were virtually identical. On November 29, 1966 Edward Y. Townsend suffered a crack in her hull while traveling on Northern Lake Huron (in the same storm that sank Daniel J. Morrell). She was deemed unseaworthy, and laid up in Sault Ste. Marie, Michigan for two years.

== Sinking ==
In 1968 she was sold to the Sea-Land Service Inc. for sale in the US Maritime Commission on vessels in the reserve fleet. She was later resold to a Spanish scrapyard. On September 15, 1968, Edward Y. Townsend passed down Port Colborne, Ontario in tow of the tugboats James Battle and Salvage Monarch. On October 1, 1968, she cleared Quebec with the steamer Dolomite, towed by the tug Hudson. She broke free on October 7 in a storm in the Atlantic Ocean, split in half, and sank in the same general vicinity as where the RMS Titanic had sunk, about 400 miles (640 km) southeast of Newfoundland.

== See also ==
- 1940 Armistice Day Blizzard
- Great Lakes Storm of 1913
- Jones and Laughlin Steel Company
- List of storms on the Great Lakes
- Mataafa Storm
- Largest shipwrecks on the Great Lakes
- List of shipwrecks on the Great Lakes
