= SS Daniel J. Morrell =

Great Lakes freighter sunk in a storm in Lake Huron

Coordinates: 44.265°N 82.833°W

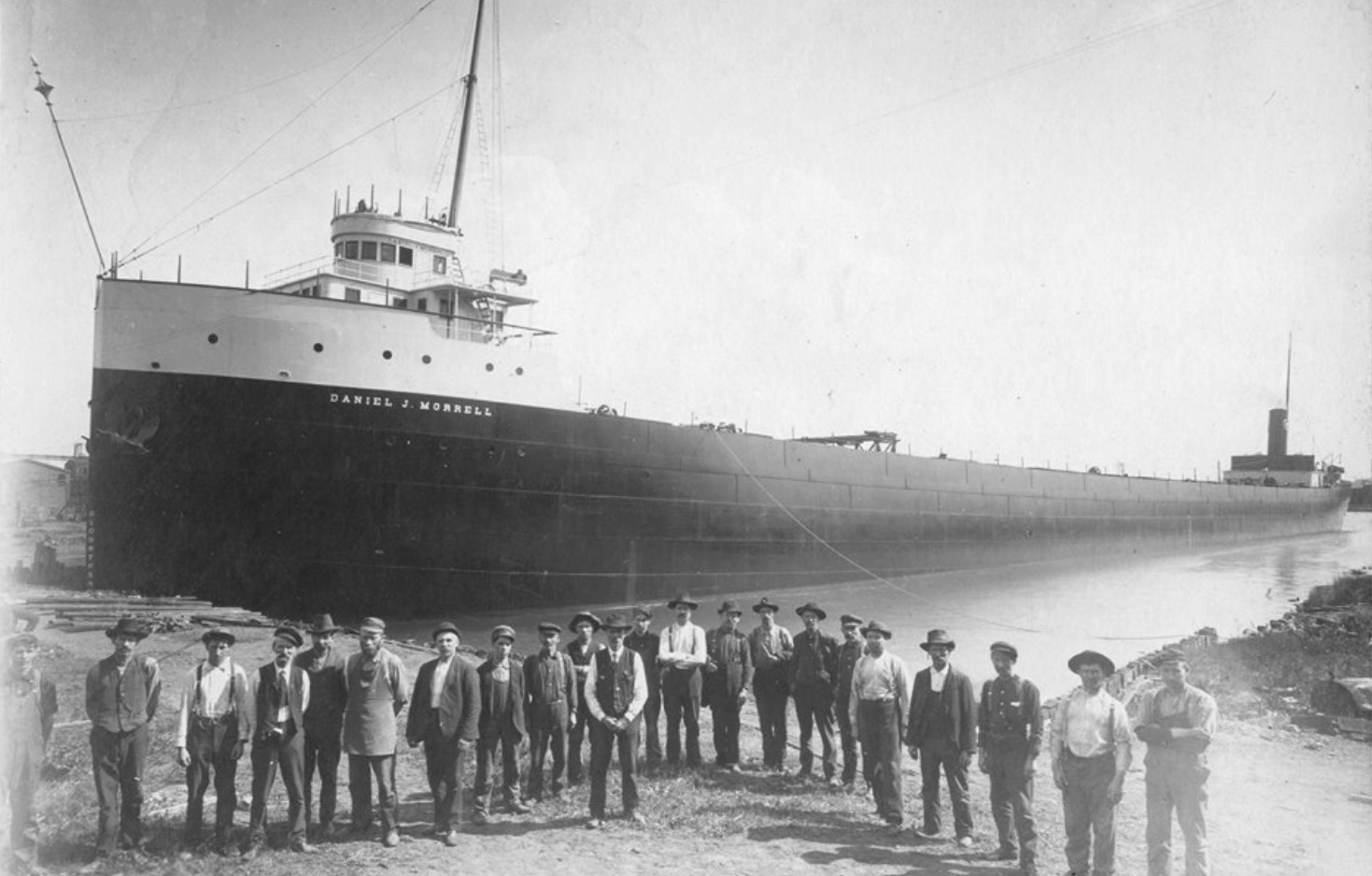
- Workers at the West Bay Shipbuilding Co. standing in front of the recently launched Daniel J. Morrell.

History

United States
- Name: Daniel J. Morrell
- Namesake: Daniel Johnson Morrell
- Operator: Cambria Steamship Company (M.A. Hanna Company, Mgrs.) 1908–1926; Cambria Steamship Company 1927–1929; Cambria Steamship Company (Bethlehem Transportation Company, Mgrs.) 1930–1966
- Port of registry: United States, Wilmington, Delaware
- Builder: West Bay City Shipbuilding Company, West Bay City, Michigan
- Yard number: 00619
- Launched: 22 August 1906
- In service: 24 September 1906
- Identification: U.S. Registry #203507
- Fate: Broke up and sank during a storm in Lake Huron, 29 November 1966
- Notes: On 13 August 1909, Daniel J. Morrell collided with the steamer Henry Phipps.

General characteristics (As built)
- Class & type: Bulk Freighter
- Tonnage: 7,239 GRT; 5,419 NRT
- Length: 603 ft (184 m)
- Beam: 58 ft (18 m)
- Depth: 32 ft (9.8 m)
- Installed power: 2 × Scotch marine boilers; 1,878 hp (1,400 kW)
- Propulsion: 1 × triple expansion steam engine
- Crew: 29

General characteristics (1945 Rebuild)
- Class & type: Bulk Freighter
- Tonnage: 7,763 GRT; 6,216 NRT
- Length: 609 ft (186 m)
- Beam: 58 ft (18 m)
- Height: 27 ft (8.2 m)
- Installed power: 2 × Babcock & Wilcox boilers; 3,200 hp (2,400 kW)
- Propulsion: 1 × Three cylinder Skinner Uniflow engine
- Crew: 29

SS Daniel J. Morrell was a 602-foot (183 m) Great Lakes freighter that broke up in a strong storm on Lake Huron on 29 November 1966, taking with her 28 of her 29 crewmen. The freighter was used to carry bulk cargoes such as iron ore but was running with only ballast when the 60-year-old ship sank.

The title "Queen of the Lakes" has often been attributed to the Morrell over the years, but officially, the title never belonged to her.

It belonged to her sister ship, the Edward Y. Townsend—built from the same plans as the Daniel J. Morrell, but made one foot longer, and launched prior to the Morrell's launching.

== Name ==
The ship was named for Daniel Johnson Morrell, the general superintendent and manager of the Cambria Iron Company, and a U.S. Representative from Pennsylvania.

== History ==
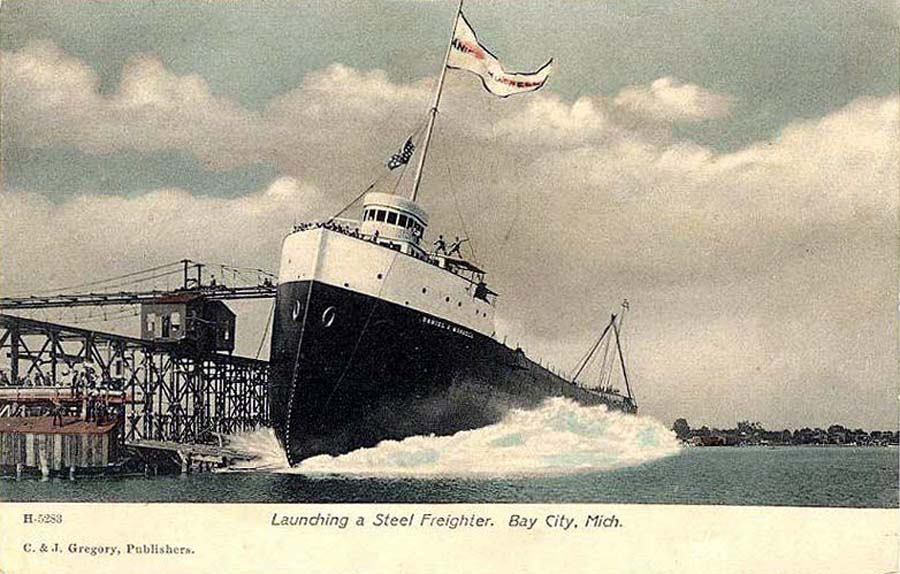
Launching of Daniel J. Morrell

Daniel J. Morrell was built at West Bay City, Michigan, by the West Bay City Shipbuilding Company, for the Cambria Steamship Company, the Cambria Iron Company's marine subsidiary that they had formed earlier that year and launched on 22 August 1906. Cambria chartered both Daniel J. Morrell and her sister ship, Edward Y. Townsend, to sail for the M. A. Hanna Company, one of the most experienced vessel management firms on the lakes. In 1930, Daniel J. Morrell and Edward Y. Townsend came under management of the Bethlehem Transportation Corporation.

== Sinking ==
Making the last run of the season with Edward Y. Townsend, Daniel J. Morrell became caught in winds exceeding 70 mph (110 km/h) and swells that topped the height of the ship (20 to 25 ft (6.1 to 7.6 m) waves). Around 02.00 on November 29, 1966, Daniel J. Morrell began to break up, forcing her crew out onto the deck. Those on the bow loaded into a life raft on the deck under the guidance of Captain Crawley, but those from the engine room were noticeably absent. At 02:15, the ship broke in half. The bow sank almost immediately, throwing the raft and its occupants into the 34 °F (1 °C) Lake Huron waters. Only four men managed to break the surface and climb back into the raft, which was now being tossed in 20 foot waves and 60 mile per hour winds. Soon after they climbed in, one of the men shouted that there was a ship close by. Moments later, it was realized that the looming object was in fact Daniel J. Morrell's stern, still afloat and being powered forward by the ship's engine. In the words of writer William Ratigan, the vessel's stern soon disappeared into the darkness "like a great wounded beast with its head shot off", taking with it the engine room crew, none of whom would be seen alive again.

No distress call was transmitted during the ship's final moments; while waiting in the life raft on deck, Captain Crawley had advised his men that the ship's electrical cable had been severed, cutting power to the bow and making a distress call impossible. The men were instructed to shoot flares from the raft as soon as they went in the water, which would hopefully alert nearby vessels to their situation.

Norm Bragg, who had survived the 1953 wreck of the SS Henry Steinbrenner on Lake Superior, was a watchman on board. He helped his shipmates understand their plight, gave quick advice, and said, "It's been good to know you."

== Emergency response ==
Daniel J. Morrell was not reported missing until 12:15, the following afternoon, November 30th, after the vessel was overdue at her destination, Taconite Harbor, Minnesota. The U.S. Coast Guard issued a "be on the lookout" alert and dispatched several vessels and aircraft to search for the missing freighter.

At around 16:00, on November 30th, a Coast Guard helicopter located the lone survivor, 26-year-old Watchman Dennis Hale, nearly frozen and aboard a grounded life raft with the bodies of three of his crewmates who had managed to climb aboard, but succumbed one by one to the elements. Hale had survived for nearly 38 hours in frigid temperatures wearing only a pair of boxer shorts, a lifejacket, and a pea coat. Afterwards, he endured more than a dozen surgeries as a result of his ordeal.

The survey of the wreck found the shipwreck in 220 ft (67 m) of water with the two sections 5 mi (8.0 km) apart. The clock on the stern was stopped at 3:28, indicating that the rear of the ship had travelled for almost 90 minutes on its own before sinking.

== Aftermath ==
Damaged irreparably in the same storm, Edward Y. Townsend, after having escaped the same fate as her sister, was discovered to have a large crack in her deck that grew worse; she was declared a total loss and was docked for almost two years. She was deemed unseaworthy, and laid up in Sault Ste. Marie, Michigan. Plans were made to tow the vessel to Europe to be scrapped. On her way during tow, she was caught in a strong storm on 7 October 1968, off Newfoundland and snapped in two, foundering in the general vicinity that Titanic had sunk.

The West German saltie Nordmeer, which had grounded at Thunder Bay Island Shoal on 19 November 1966, was declared a total loss after the additional damage to its bottom caused by the storm.

The destructive force of the November seas and wind were an important factor in this loss, as it has been in many similar incidents on the Great Lakes. The Coast Guard investigation of the sinking of Daniel J. Morrell concluded that she broke in half due to low temperature embrittlement of the steel used in her hull which was a "common problem" in ships built before 1948.

There was a real question as to whether the Morrell, which was in poor condition, should have been out on Lake Huron at all during the storm; according to Dennis Hale, Captain Crawley admitted as much during the sinking. Along with Edward Y. Townsend, she was one of only two ships that had not taken shelter, the two captains having decided that coming about in the heavy seas was likely to capsize their vessels, making pressing on the safer choice.

== Fate of the crew ==
The remains of 26 of the 28 lost crewmen were recovered, most in the days following the sinking, although bodies from Daniel J. Morrell continued to be found well into May of the following year. The two men whose bodies were never recovered were declared legally dead in May 1967. The sole survivor of the sinking, Dennis Hale, died of cancer on September 2nd, 2015, at the age of 75.

The high death toll among the crew helped cement two lessons; that hypothermia was the leading killer of sailors, and that, in such turbulent seas, lifeboats on davits are largely useless when it comes to saving lives.

== See also ==
- Great Lakes Storm of 1913
- Great Storms of the North American Great Lakes
- SS Henry Steinbrenner
- SS Carl D. Bradley
- SS Edmund Fitzgerald
- Liberty ships#Problems
- Constance Tipper
- SS Schenectady
