= SS Etruria =

Steel freighter that sank on Lake Huron in 1905

Coordinates: 45.483017°N 83.473663°W

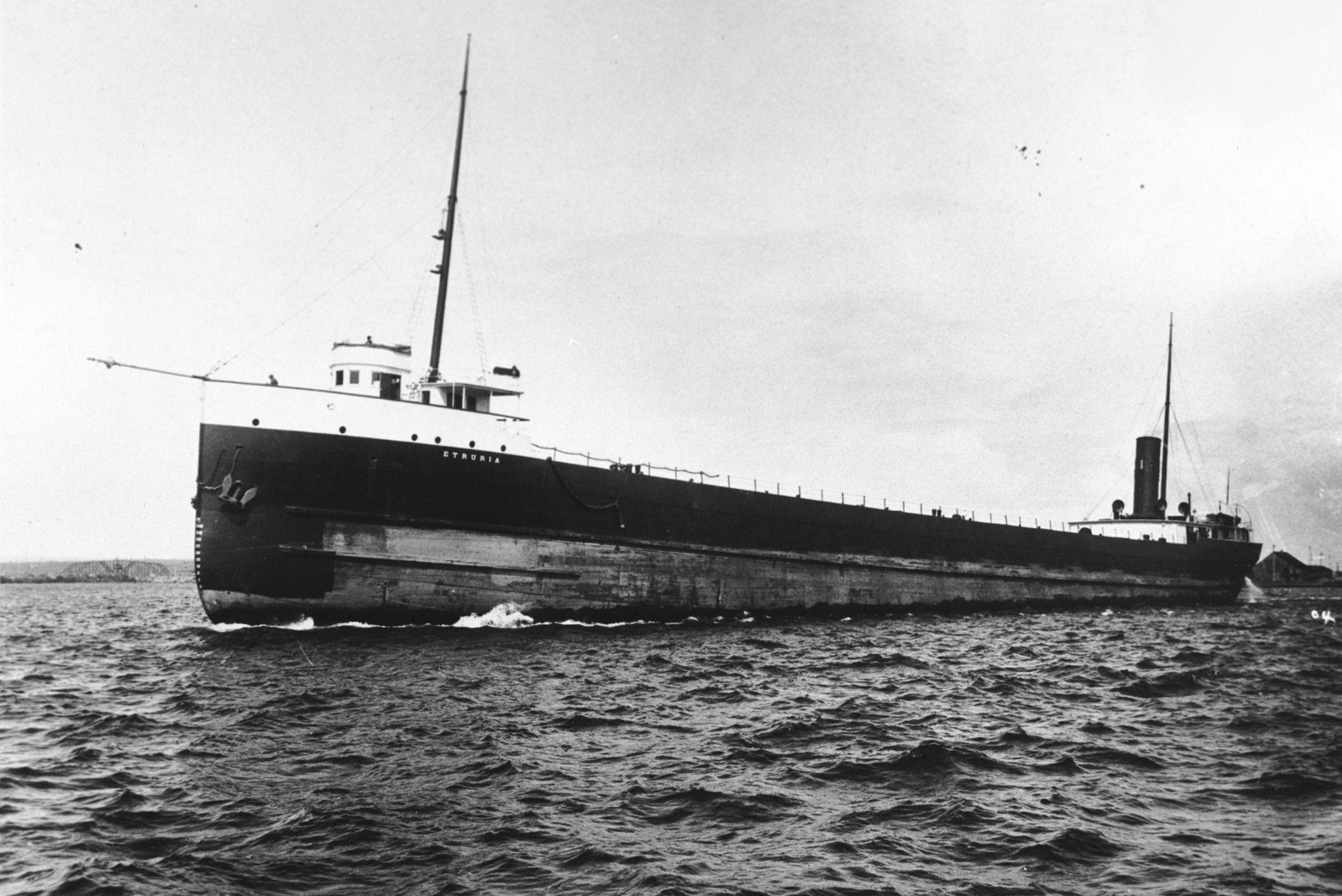
- Etruria upbound at the Soo Locks in 1904

History

United States
- Name: Etruria
- Operator: Hawgood Transit Company
- Port of registry: Cleveland, Ohio
- Builder: West Bay City Shipbuilding Company
- Yard number: 604
- Launched: February 8, 1902
- In service: 1902
- Out of service: June 18, 1905
- Identification: U.S. Registry #136977
- Fate: Rammed by the steamer Amasa Stone on Lake Huron
- Wreck discovered: May 17, 2011

General characteristics
- Class & type: Lake freighter
- Tonnage: 4653 GRT; 3415 NRT
- Length: 434 feet (132 m) LOA; 414 ft (126 m) LBP
- Beam: 50 feet (15 m)
- Depth: 28 feet (8.5 m)
- Installed power: 2 × Scotch marine boilers
- Propulsion: 1500-horsepower triple expansion steam engine
- Capacity: 7000 tons
- Notes: Largest ship lost on the Great Lakes at the time of sinking

SS Etruria was a steel hulled lake freighter that served on the Great Lakes of North America from her construction in 1902 to her sinking in 1905. On June 18, 1905, while sailing upbound on Lake Huron with a cargo of coal, she was rammed and sunk by the freighter Amasa Stone 10 miles (16 km) off Presque Isle Light. For nearly 106 years the location of Etruria's wreck remained unknown, until the spring of 2011 when her wreck was found upside down in 310 feet (94 m) of water.

== History ==
=== Design and construction ===
Etruria was named after the famous Cunard Line ocean liner, RMS Etruria. Etruria was built by the West Bay City Shipbuilding Company in West Bay City, Michigan for the Hawgood Transit Company of Cleveland, Ohio. She had an overall length of 434 feet (132 m), and a between perpendiculars length of 414 feet (126 m). Her beam was 50 feet (15 m) wide, and in her original enrollment, her depth was listed as 24 feet (7.3 m); also, in her original enrollment, her gross register tonnage was listed at 4744 tons and her net register tonnage was listed at 4439 tons. She was powered by a 1500-horsepower triple expansion steam engine, which was fueled by two Scotch marine boilers. She had a cargo capacity of 7000 tons. She was also built with a single deck, and twelve cargo hatches.

Etruria was the first of four identical sister ships built for the Hawgood Transit Company. Her sisters were (in order of construction), Bransford, J.M. Jenks and H.B. Hawgood.

=== Service history ===
Etruria was launched on February 8, 1902 as hull number #604. She was enrolled for the first time on April 12, 1905 in Port Huron, Michigan, and was given the official number #136977. On April 15, 1902 Etruria was re-enrolled in Cleveland, Ohio. On March 25, 1903 an error in Etruria's enrollment was corrected; her depth was corrected from 24 feet (7.3 m) to 28 feet (8.5 m); and her gross tonnage was corrected from 4744 tons to 4653 tons, and her net tonnage was corrected from 4439 tons to 3415 tons.

=== Final voyage ===
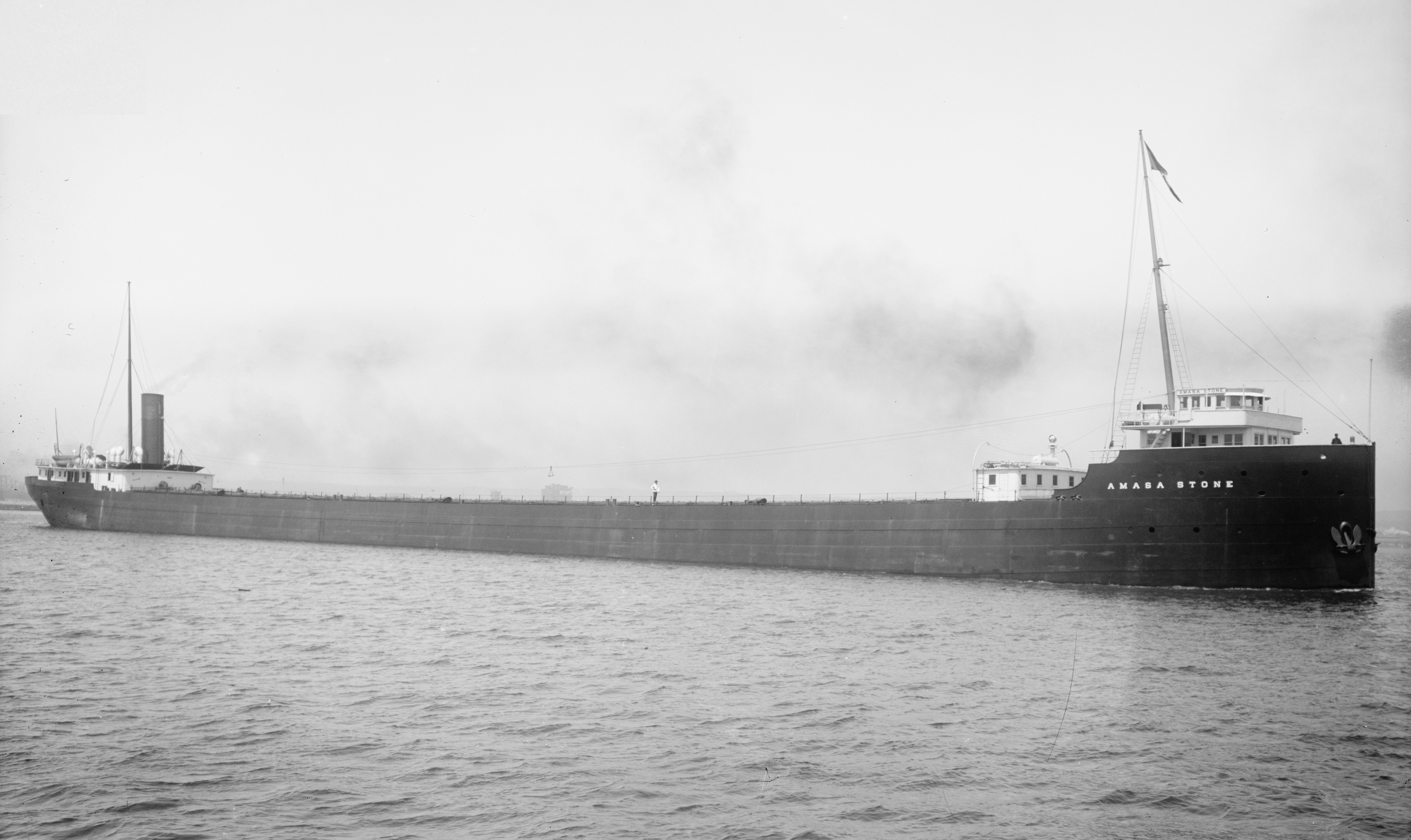
Amasa Stone

On June 18, 1905 while upbound with a cargo of coal from Toledo, Ohio, heading to Superior, Wisconsin, Etruria was rammed by the larger steel freighter Amasa Stone on her starboard side, abreast of her No.9 hatch. After just five minutes, Etruria rolled over and sank about 10 miles (16 km) off Presque Isle Light; her entire crew was rescued by the steamer Maritana.

At the time of her sinking, Etruria was the largest freighter ever to have sunk on the Great Lakes.

Etruria's enrollment surrendered on June 30, 1905.

=== Aftermath ===
Shortly after Etruria's sinking, the Hawgood Transit Company and the Mesaba Steamship Company (owners of Amasa Stone) filed several lawsuits against each other for the damage done to their respective vessels. The United States Court of Appeals for the Sixth Circuit rendered a final judgement on June 15, 1908. A brief by the Hawgood Transit Company stated that:

The steamer Etruria was laden with 7,000 net tons of coal loaded on Lake Erie and destined for Lake Michigan ports. At all times the Etruria was properly crewed and fully manned. About 01:00 hours on June 18, 1905, the hazy night turned to rain and fog set in, and the Etruria proceeded at a moderate pace, sounding her fog signal regularly. About 03:35 hours that morning on a proper course headed for the Straits of Mackinac, the Etruria heard the fog signals of a steamer, which proved to be the Amasa Stone. It sounded a long distance from the Etruria and was distinctly to her starboard. At this point, the Etruria blew a two-blast signal but the Stone didn’t reply with the same passing signal, and the Etruria slowed to bare steerage, stopped her engine completely and shortly thereafter, without warning or signal, the Stone came out of the fog at full speed. The Stone struck the Etruria a heavy blow on her starboard side abreast hatch No.9, breaking in her side. The Etruria began to list and sank at once, meanwhile blowing distress signals. The Etruria launched its lifeboats just in time to see the steamer roll over. As it turned upside down, the hatches gave way, and the coal cargo spilled out before the sinking ship. The Amasa Stone then departed the scene without rendering assistance. The steamer Maritana was upbound in the vicinity and picked up the crew, landing them at Detour and at the Sault.

The lawsuit stated that Etruria had a value of $265,000, her cargo had a value of $13,460.70 and the crew's effects had a value of $3,029.11; in total, Etruria was a $281,489.81 loss. The suit further stated that the collision was "due solely to the negligence and want of care on the part of Amasa Stone and those in charge of navigation". Amasa Stone was found to be guilty of the following actions:

- Not maintaining an efficient lookout
- Not answering passing signals
- Running at excessive speed
- Failing to stop and reverse
- Failing to stand by

Lawyers for the Mesaba Steamship Company concluded that Etruria was not travelling at a slow speed, but at a fast one and that her navigational officers were guilty of inattention. They also concluded that Amasa Stone did not leave the scene following the collision, but that she turned round, and tried to offer assistance, but Etruria's crew took to the lifeboats, and rowed off in the opposite direction. When both sides made their argument, Judge Henry Harrison Swan ruled in Detroit, Michigan that both vessels were equally at fault, and that insurance proceeds were the only means of recouping each vessel's loss.

== Etruria wreck ==
=== Discovery ===
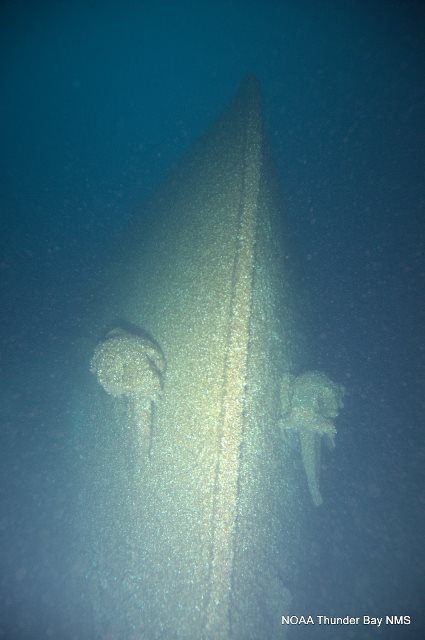
Bow of Etruria

In 2011 a group consisting of expert shipwreck hunters and high school students from Saginaw, Michigan tried to locate the long sought-after semi-whaleback steamer Choctaw. Their search effort was made into a documentary named "Project Shiphunt", which was sponsored by Sony and Intel. On May 17, 2011 they discovered two shipwrecks, Etruria and the schooner M.F. Merrick which sank in 1889 after a collision with the steamer R.P. Ranney.

=== Etruria today ===
The remains of Etruria rest in 310 feet (94 m) of cold fresh water. The wreck is upside down, with 405 feet (123 m) of her hull exposed, with a portion of her stern being buried. Her bow is raised above the sediment by several feet allowing access to her intact pilot house and forward deck house area and first cargo hatch. Her forward ladder is in place running to the port side bridge wing, which is buried in sediment. Her two stockless anchors are still intact at her bow. Discovery of the wrecks was made public on July 13, 2011. Her wreck is part of the Thunder Bay National Marine Sanctuary.

=== National Register of Historic Places nomination ===
On September 19, 2014 the wreck of Etruria was nominated for a listing on the National Register of Historic Places, for her state level significance. Her listing was denied; had she been listed, she would have been given the reference number #14001009.

== See also ==
- List of shipwrecks in the Thunder Bay National Marine Sanctuary
- List of shipwrecks on the Great Lakes
- List of Great Lakes shipwrecks on the National Register of Historic Places
