= SS Amasa Stone =

Coordinates: 45.318140°N 85.292155°W

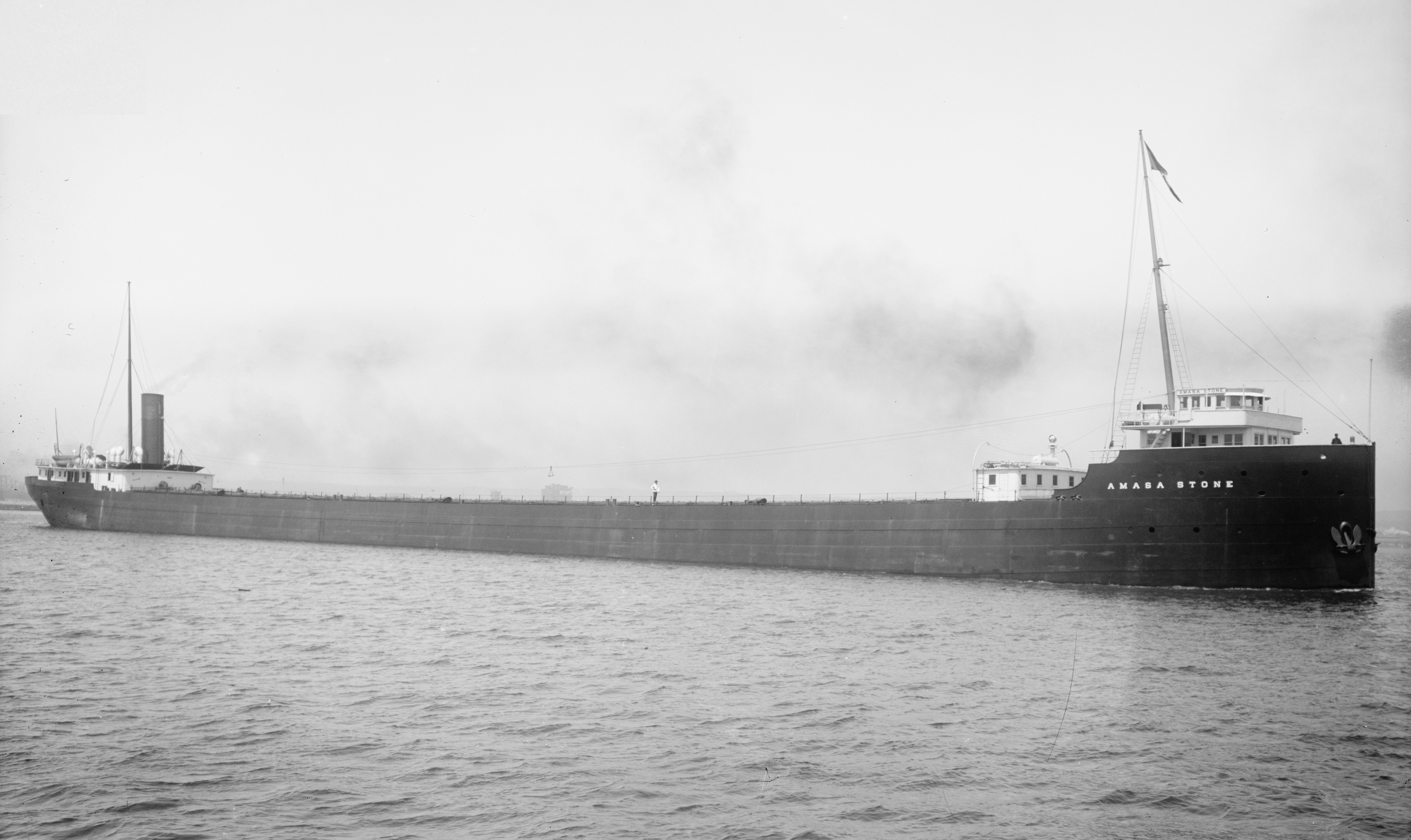
- The steamer Amasa Stone possibly on her maiden voyage

History

United States
- Name: Amasa Stone
- Namesake: Amasa Stone
- Operator: Mesaba Steamship Company
- Port of registry: United States, Wilmington, Delaware
- Builder: Detroit Shipbuilding Company, Wyandotte, Michigan
- Yard number: 158
- Launched: 25 March 1905
- In service: 1905
- Out of service: 1965
- Identification: U.S. Registry
- Fate: Sunk as a breakwater in Charlevoix, Michigan
- Notes: Amasa Stone rescued 6 crew members from the capsized sandsucker George J. Whelan

General characteristics
- Tonnage: 6,282 GRT; 4,930 NRT
- Length: 545 ft (166 m)
- Beam: 55 ft (17 m)
- Depth: 31 ft (9.4 m)
- Installed power: 2 x Scotch marine boilers
- Propulsion: 1,800 hp (1,300 kW) triple expansion steam engine (1905–1952) 1,800 hp, 5-cylinder Skinner uniflow engine (1952–1965)
- Capacity: 10,000 tons

SS Amasa Stone was a 545-foot (166 m) Great Lakes freighter that was sunk as a breakwater in 1965, Charlevoix, Michigan. She was built for the Mesaba Steamship Company by the Detroit Shipbuilding Company of Wyandotte, Michigan. She was launched on March 25, 1905, as hull #158. She was powered by an 1,800-horsepower (1,300 kW) triple expansion steam engine and two scotch marine boilers.

The launch of the ore carrier Amasa Stone

== History ==
On June 18, 1905 Amasa Stone was downbound with a cargo of iron ore bound from Duluth, Minnesota, to Lake Erie when she rammed and sank the steamer Etruria in heavy fog. Etruria was upbound with coal from Toledo, Ohio, for Superior, Wisconsin. The collision occurred about ten miles (16 km) off Presque Isle Light on Lake Huron. Amasa Stone punched a hole in starboard side abreast of the ninth cargo hatch; crew members of Etruria were rescued from lifeboats by the steamer Maritana. Amasa Stone was traveling at full speed at the time of the collision.

In 1913 Amasa Stone was merged in the fleet owned by Interlake Steamship Company. On July 24, 1924 Amasa Stone collided with steamer Merton E. Farr in fog off Ile Parisienne, Lake Superior; the amount of money it cost to repair the damage was $7,000. On October 22, 1929, the Stone made it through the same storm that sank the train ferry Milwaukee; the Stone was downbound with 10,000 tons of coal for Ludington, Michigan, at the time of the sinking. On July 29, 1930 Amasa Stone rescued 6 of the 21 crew members from the sandsucker George J. Whelan which capsized in heavy seas on Lake Erie, about six miles (9.7 km) north of Dunkirk, New York. In 1938 she had new boilers installed. In 1952 she was re-powered with a 1,800 horsepower, 5-cylinder Skinner uniflow engine.

== Breakwater in Charlevoix ==
Amasa Stone made her last trip in 1959 and in 1960 was decommissioned and laid up. In 1964 she was sold to the Marine Salvage Ltd. of Port Colborne, Ontario, and in 1965 sold on to the Medusa Portland Cement Company of Charlevoix, Michigan, where, joined by the steamer Charles S. Hebard, she would function as a dock and breakwater. Both ships were stripped down to their hulls and sunk at the port entrance in Charlevoix, where they remain to this day.
