= SS John Sherwin (1906) =

American steel-hulled, propeller-driven Great Lakes freighter

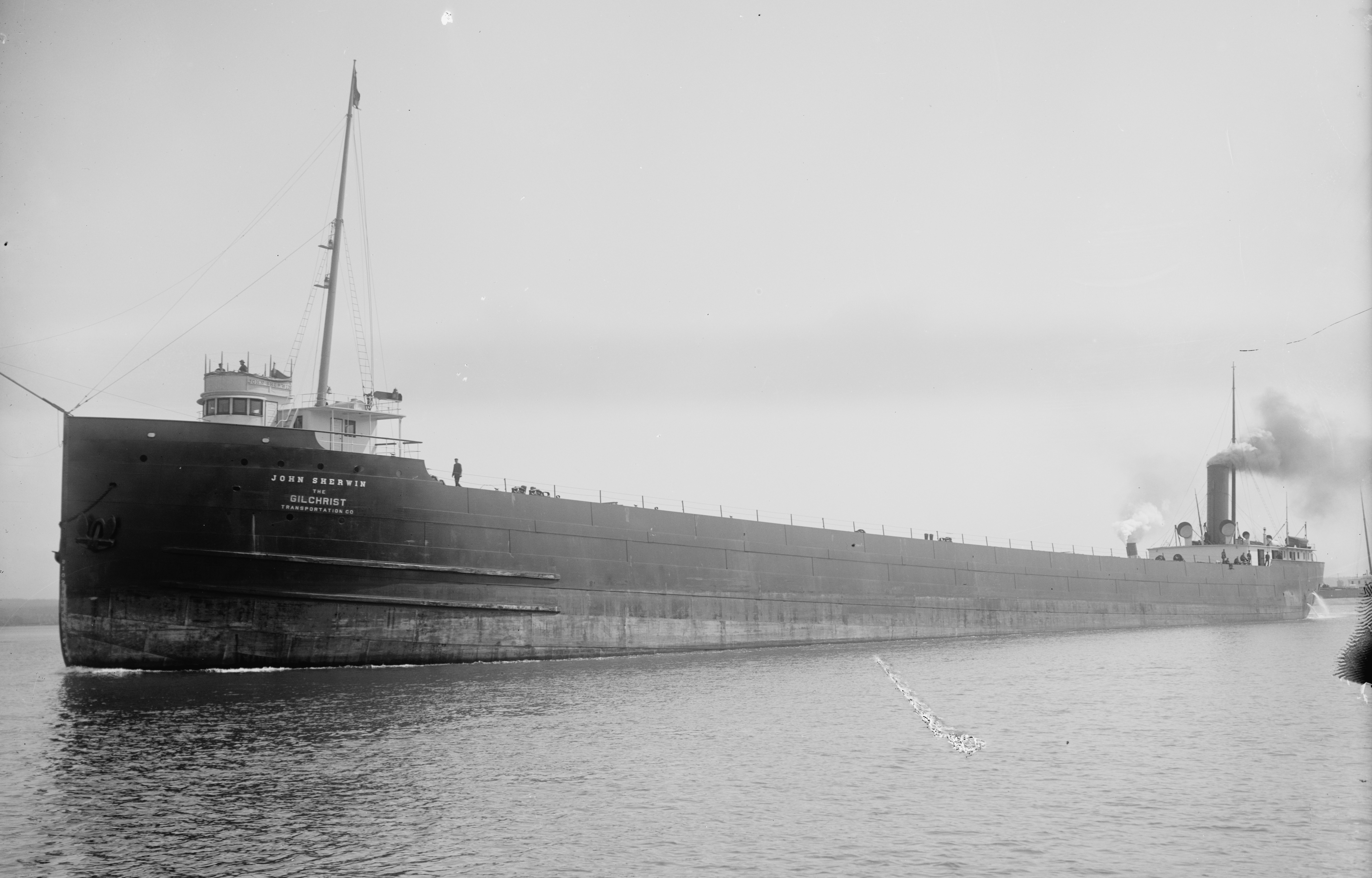
- The John Sherwin underway

History

United States
- Name: John Sherwin 1906-1958; Saturn 1958-1959; George M. Steinbrenner 1959-1969; Kinsman Venture 1969-1974
- Namesake: John Sherwin
- Operator: Gilchrist Transportation Company 1906-1913; Lackawanna Steamship Company 1913-1959; Kinsman Transit Company 1959-1974
- Port of registry: United States, Fairport, Ohio
- Builder: West Bay City Shipbuilding Company
- Yard number: 617
- Launched: March 10, 1906
- In service: April 13, 1906
- Out of service: August 3, 1974
- Identification: U.S. #202910
- Fate: Scrapped in 1974, in Germany

General characteristics
- Class & type: Lake freighter
- Tonnage: 7,159 gross 5,744 net
- Length: 534 ft (163 m)
- Beam: 54 ft (16 m)
- Depth: 31 ft (9.4 m)
- Installed power: 2x Scotch marine boilers
- Propulsion: 1,500 horsepower triple expansion steam engine

The John Sherwin was an American steel-hulled, propeller-driven Great Lakes freighter built in 1906 by the West Bay City Shipbuilding Company (F.W. Wheeler Shipyards) of Bay City, Michigan for service on the Great Lakes of North America. She was used to transport bulk cargoes such as coal, iron ore and grain. She served from her launching in 1906 to her scrapping in 1974, in Germany.

== History ==
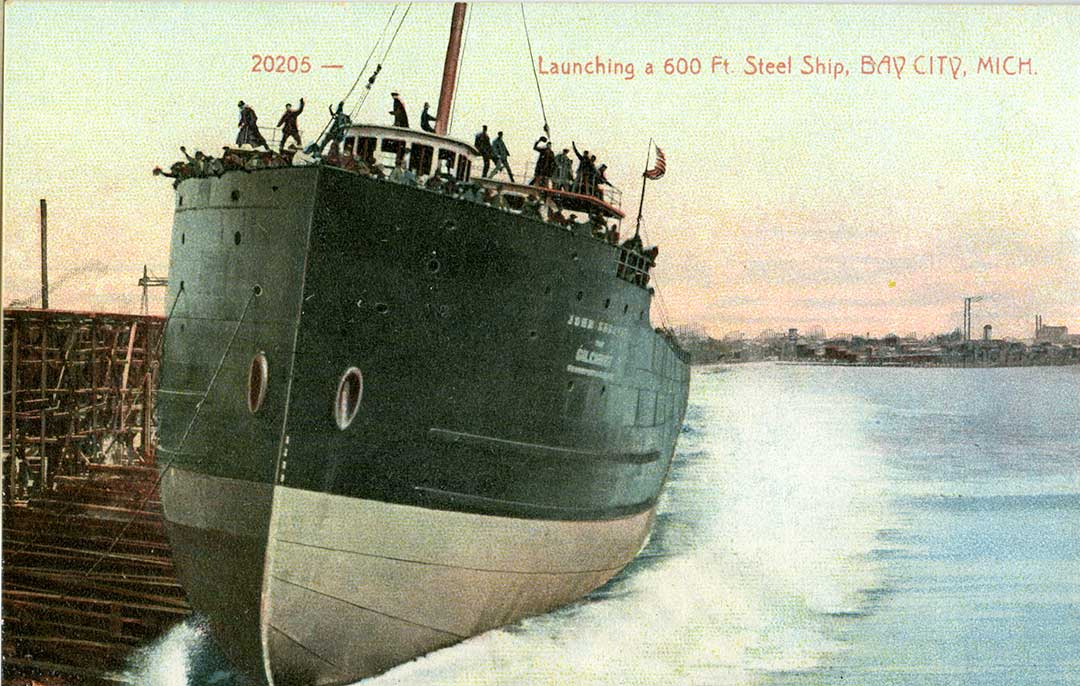
Launch of John Sherwin

The Sherwin was launched on March 10, 1906, as hull number #617. She had a length of 534-feet, a beam of 54-feet and a depth of 31-feet. She was powered by a 1,500 horsepower triple expansion steam engine and fueled by two coal-fired Scotch marine boilers. Her official number was U.S. #202910.

The Sherwin was commissioned by the Gilchrist Transportation Company of Cleveland, Ohio. She entered service on April 13, 1906. Her homeport was Fairport, Ohio. In 1910 Gilchrist Transportation Company's fleet went into receivership . For three years the Sherwin was inactive, but in 1913 she was sold at an auction to the Lackawanna Steamship Company (Pickands Mather & Co., Mgr.) of Cleveland, Ohio. Later in 1913 the fleet was renamed Interlake Steamship Company.

In 1938 the Sherwin was lengthened to 540-feet in length. In 1958 she was renamed Saturn to free up the name John Sherwin for another vessel built for the Interlake fleet. In 1959 the Saturn was sold to the Kinsman Transit Company of Cleveland, Ohio and renamed George M. Steinbrenner. In 1964 the fleet was renamed Kinsman Marine Transit Company. In 1969 the Steinbrenner was renamed Kinsman Venture.

== Breakwater for Ontario Hydro ==
In 1970 the Venture was sold to the Canadian Dredge & Dock Ltd. along with the Ridgetown and the Lackawanna for use as a temporary breakwater Nanticoke, Ontario construction of a power plant for Ontario Hydro.

In August 1973 she was raised and towed to Toronto, Ontario and went into layup for the winter. She was eventually sold to a German scrapyard. On August 3, 1974, she cleared Quebec with the steamer Lackawanna in tow of the Polish tug Jantar.
