= SS Hydrus (1903) =

American lake freighter (1903–1913)

Coordinates: 44°33′42″N 82°36′49.5″W

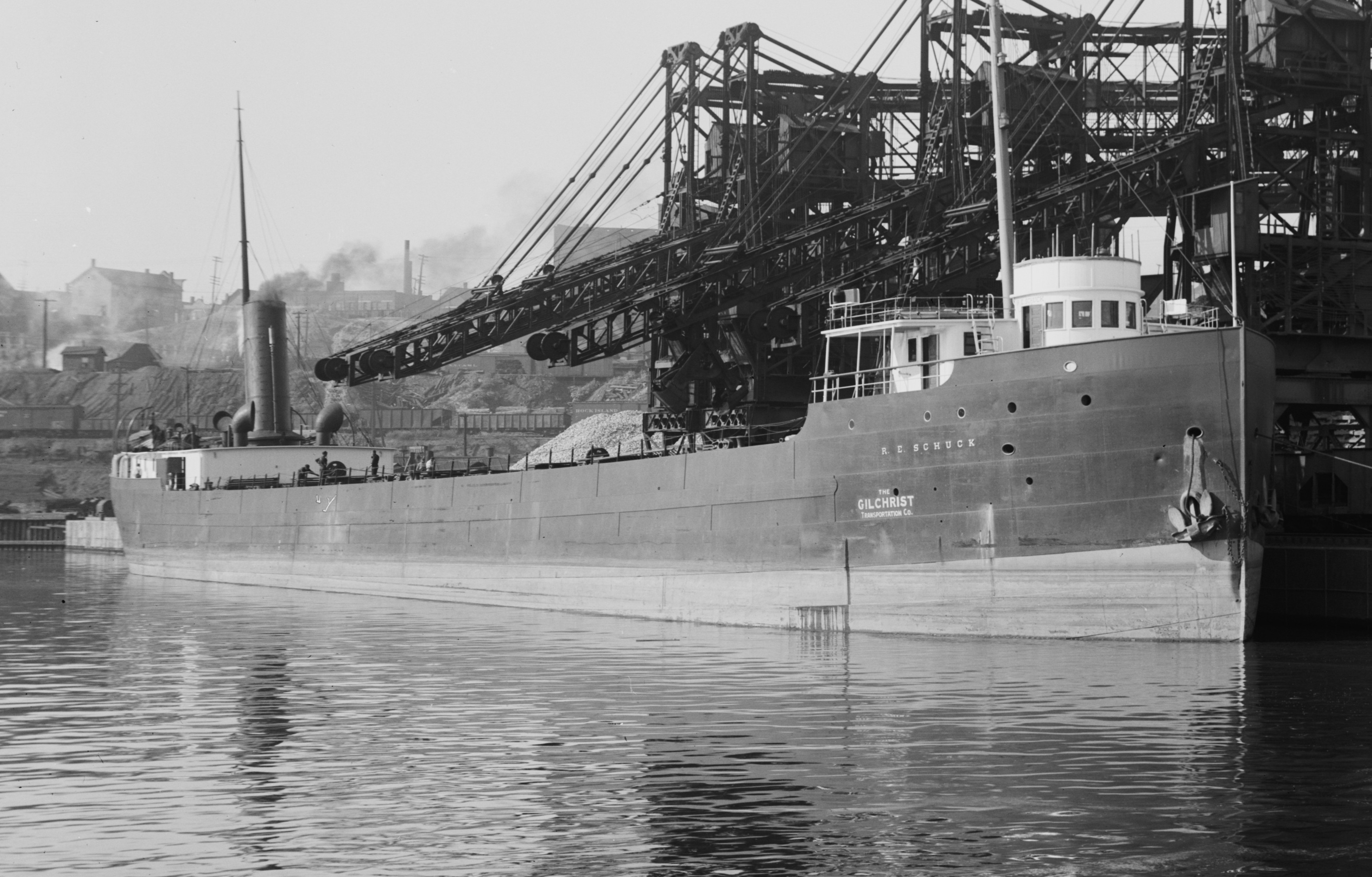

History

United States
- Name: R. E. Schuck (1903–1913); Hydrus (1913–1913)
- Operator: Gilchrist Transportation Company (1903–1913); Interlake Steamship Company (1913–1913)
- Port of registry: Fairport, Ohio
- Builder: American Ship Building Company, Lorain, Ohio
- Cost: $275,000 ($7.69 million in 2024) (Note: Johnston, Louis & Williamson, Samuel H. (2023). "What Was the U.S. GDP Then?". MeasuringWorth. United States Gross Domestic Product deflator figures follow the MeasuringWorth series.)
- Yard number: 327
- Launched: 12 September 1903
- Christened: Elsie Schmidt
- Maiden voyage: 5 October 1903
- Out of service: 9 November 1913
- Identification: US official number 200315
- Fate: Sank on Lake Huron

General characteristics
- Class & type: Lake freighter
- Tonnage: 4,713 GRT; 3,384 NRT
- Length: 436 feet (132.9 m) o/a; 416 feet (126.8 m) p/p
- Beam: 50 feet (15.2 m)
- Depth: 28 feet (8.5 m)
- Installed power: Engine: 1 × 1,480 ihp (1,100 kW) 90 RPM triple expansion steam engine; Boilers: 2 × 170 pounds per square inch (1,200 kPa) Scotch marine boilers
- Propulsion: 1 × propeller
- Capacity: 7,000 long tons (7,112 t) (Note: One source list the capacity as 6,200 long tons (6,299 t), while another listed it as 6,200 long tons (6,299 t) on an 18 feet (5.5 m) draft.)

SS Hydrus was an American lake freighter in service between 1903 and 1913. She was built under the name R. E. Schuck by the American Ship Building Company in Lorain, Ohio, for the Gilchrist Transportation Company of Cleveland, Ohio. In 1913, she was sold at auction to the Pickands Mather & Company's Interlake Steamship Company three years after the Gilchrist fleet went into receivership, and was renamed Hydrus. She was involved in multiple accidents.

In early November 1913, Hydrus was downbound from Duluth, Minnesota, with a cargo of iron ore. She passed through the Soo Locks on the night of 8 November, leaving the shelter of the St. Marys River. Once out on the open waters of Lake Huron, she sailed into the most destructive storm in the history of the Great Lakes, sinking, and killing her entire crew.

The wreck of Hydrus was located in July 2015, in over 160 feet (48.8 m) of water.

== History ==
=== Background ===
In 1843, the gunship USS Michigan became the first iron-hulled vessel built on the Great Lakes upon her launching in Erie, Pennsylvania. Though Canadian merchants were importing iron vessels prefabricated in the United Kingdom by the mid-1840s, the first regionally produced iron-hulled merchant vessel, Merchant, would not be built until 1862. Despite Merchant's clear success proving the potential of iron hulls, ships built from wood remained preferable until the 1880s due to their lower cost, as well as the abundance of high-quality timber and workers trained in carpentry. Between the early 1870s and the mid-1880s, shipyards around the Great Lakes began to construct iron ships on a relatively large scale.

In 1884, the first steel freighters were built on the Great Lakes, with metal becoming a material used in the construction of new hulls by the 1890s. Rapidly decreasing steel prices, combined with the development of the pneumatic rivet gun and the advancement of gantry cranes enabling shipyard employees to work at an increased speed and with greater efficiency, contributed to the rapid increase in the size of lake freighters in the late 19th and early 20th centuries.

Throughout the 1880s, the iron ore trade on the Great Lakes grew quickly, primarily due to the increasing size of the lake freighters and the rise in the number of trips they made to the ore docks of Lake Superior. With the railways unable to keep up with the rapid extraction of iron ore, bulk freighters became an integral component in the region's iron ore industry. By 1890, 57% of the 16,000,000 long tons (16,256,751 t) of the iron ore produced by mines in the United States was sourced from the region surrounding Lake Superior.

Joseph C. Gilchrist was a major vessel operator on the Great Lakes in the late-19th and early-20th centuries, eventually amassing the second-largest American-owned fleet on them. He would regularly order numerous "classes" of identical vessels in bulk, from multiple shipyards. In October 1902, the Detroit Free Press reported on Gilchrist's order of six identical freighters, two from the American Ship Building Company. One of R. E. Schuck's sister ships included Lewis Woodruff, later named Argus.

=== Design and construction ===
R. E. Schuck was built by the American Ship Building Company at their yard in Lorain, Ohio, at a cost of $275,000 ($7.69 million in 2024), as yard number 327. She was built for the Gilchrist Transportation Company of Cleveland, Ohio, and was the third vessel built at the shipyard for that fleet in 1903. Her namesake was a prominent merchant from Sandusky, Ohio, who held a financial interest in the Gilchrist fleet, and was present at the launching ceremony. The launching was originally scheduled to take place on 10 September, but was delayed by the shipyard. A worker fell into R. E. Schuck's hold a day before her launch, breaking two ribs.

Customary to launching traditions on the Great Lakes, R. E. Schuck was launched on a Saturday, at 12:00, on 12 September 1903. She was launched in front of a crowd of around 1,000 people, including a party of honoured guests from Cleveland and Sandusky. She was christened by Elsie Schmidt, the daughter of August Schmidt Jr, one of R. E. Schuck's guests from Sandusky.

She was built on the channel system, a longitudinal frame style introduced on the Great Lakes in the mid-1890s. It consisted of several rows of flanged steel plates running the entire length of a vessel's bottom, deriving its name from the "channels" between the frames. This method provided vessels with additional strength, as well as preventing damage sustained in groundings from spreading to other areas of the hull, and increasing cargo capacity. In spite of rapid advances in shipbuilding technology, the hold of R. E. Schuck remained reminiscent of those found on wooden lake freighters. Between 1882 and 1904, the cargo holds of all iron and steel freighters contained stanchions, vertical columns designed to support their decks; and steel angles which were the equivalent of the knees used on wooden freighters. (Note: It would not be until 1904 that the traditional construction methods were dispensed with in favour of steel arches and sloped side "hopper" tanks, in the freighter Augustus B. Wolvin.)

Her 12 hatches, which were longitudinally 8 feet (2.4 m) in depth, were positioned 24 feet (7.3 m) apart, when measured from their centres. Her hull contained three watertight bulkheads. The cargo hold was divided into four separate compartments; the first of which was 1,600 long tons (1,626 t) in capacity, while the remaining three had a capacity of 1,750 long tons (1,778 t). Her overall capacity was listed as 7,000 long tons (7,112 t).

R. E. Schuck was a medium-sized freighter by the standards of the early-20th century. Her hull had an overall length of 436 feet (132.9 m), a length between perpendiculars of 416 feet (126.8 m). Additionally, the hull was 50 feet (15.2 m) in beam, and 28 feet (8.5 m) in depth. The measurements of her register tonnage were calculated as 4,713 gross and 3,384 net tons, respectively.

She was powered by a 1,480 ihp (1,100 kW) 90 rpm triple expansion steam engine; the cylinders of the engine were 22 inches (55.9 cm), 35 inches (88.9 cm), and 58 inches (147.3 cm) in diameter, and had a stroke of 40 inches (101.6 cm). Steam was provided by two Scotch marine boilers 13.2 feet (4.0 m) in diameter, 11.6 feet (3.5 m) in length, with a working pressure of 170-pound-per-square-inch (1,200 kPa). The boilers were each fitted with four furnaces, accounting for a combined grate surface of 88 square feet (8.2 m^{2}), and a total heating surface of 4,292 square feet (398.7 m^{2}). The engine and boilers were supplied by the American Ship Building Company's yard in Cleveland.

=== Service history ===
R. E. Schuck was assigned the US official number was 200315, while her port of registry was Fairport, Ohio. She departed Lorain on her maiden voyage, without cargo, on 5 October 1903. She headed for Duluth, Minnesota, to load iron ore, locking through the Soo Locks at Sault Ste. Marie, Michigan, at 18:30 on 7 October. R. E. Schuck arrived in Duluth on 9 October, and departed with her ore cargo two days later, bound for a port on Lake Erie.

She assisted the tugs A. W. Colton and Sarnia in rescuing the steamer Jupiter, after she ran around in the St. Clair River near Sarnia, Ontario, on 16 October 1904. On 10 November 1905, R. E. Schuck ran aground at the harbour entrance at Erie due to a navigational error, having strayed south of the correct channel. She was freed quickly.

At the end of November 1905, while bound for Duluth to load grain, R. E. Schuck survived the Mataafa Storm on Lake Superior. On 29 November, a report by The Cleveland Leader included her among the vessels listed as missing in the aftermath of the storm. That same day, The Plain Dealer published an unconfirmed report claiming she had run aground near Duluth. On 2 December, The Cleveland Leader confirmed that R. E. Schuck had navigated the storm safely.

She was subject to a labour dispute on 3 May 1906, while docked in Sheboygan, Wisconsin. The striking workers returned to work that same day, allowing her to depart with a full complement. In addition to previous larger libels, several Gilchrist vessels, including R. E. Schuck, had smaller ones placed on them in January 1910, while docked in Superior, Wisconsin.

While waiting to pass through the Soo Locks at Sault Ste. Marie on 4 May 1910, the barge Tyrone was driven against R. E. Schuck by heavy winds. The barge suffered damage to hew bow and forward water tank. R. E. Schuck docked in Cleveland on 26 August 1910, to receive repairs to four damaged hull plates. The Plain Dealer projected the repairs to take five days.

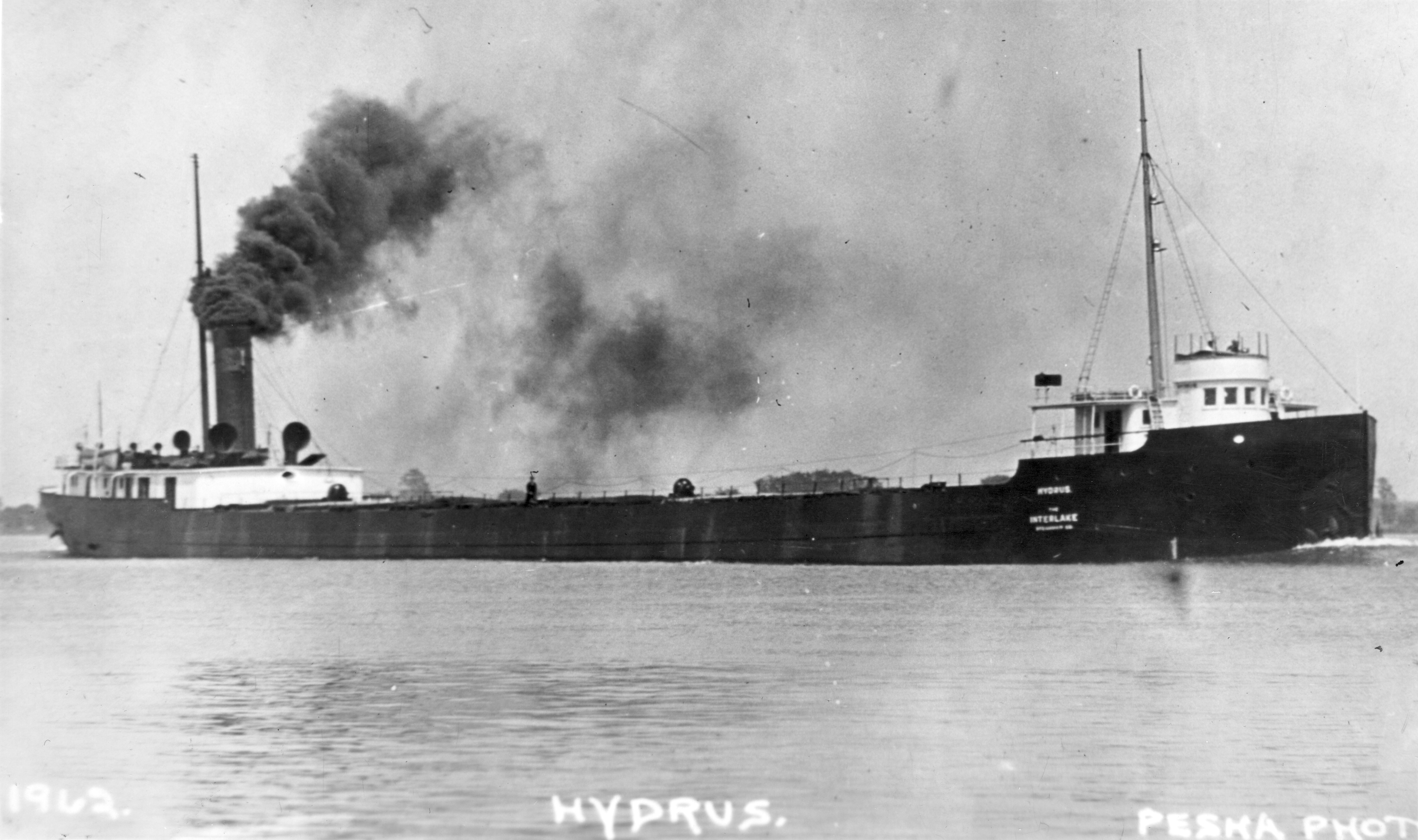
Hydrus, after acquisition by the Interlake Steamship Company

Due to his rapid commissioning of several large vessels, Gilchrist accrued significant debts. The Panic of 1907 significantly affected business on the Great Lakes, ensuring a significant glut of vessels in comparison to the quantity of cargo available to them. The Gilchrist fleet went into receivership in 1910, with Shane and George A. Garretson of the Bank of Commerce, major financiers of the business, being appointed as receivers. Following further financial hardship, the sale of the fleet was ordered by the United States District Court for the Northern District of Ohio in August 1912. A large portion of the fleet was sold at auction on 6 March 1913. R. E. Schuck, along with seven other vessels, was appraised at $205,000 ($4.77 million in 2024).

She was sold to the Pickands Mather & Company of Cleveland, becoming one of 17 freighters absorbed into their newly-formed Interlake Steamship Company, and received the new name Hydrus, alluding to a mythical creature of the same name.

=== Final voyage ===
On 3 November 1913, Hydrus arrived in Duluth with a cargo of coal, and departed on 6 November. She headed downbound for Cleveland with a cargo of iron ore, under the command of Captain John H. Lowe. Hydrus became one of approximately 20 vessels which sought shelter in Whitefish Bay early on 8 November. After waiting for nearly 12 hours, Hydrus entered, and passed through the Soo Locks at 21:30 on 8 November, behind the freighters James Carruthers and J. H. Sheadle. Amid high winds, the three vessels navigated the St. Marys River. By 01:55 on November 9, all three had passed DeTour, Michigan, and headed out into Lake Huron. Two lanterns, white above red, warning of an oncoming storm were hoisted in DeTour at the time.

Hydrus had already begun to face heavy snowfall by the time she reached central Lake Huron, where she sailed into the most destructive storm in the history of the Great Lakes. Winds reached average speeds of 60 miles per hour (96.6 km/h), peaking at 90 miles per hour (144.8 km/h) off Harbor Beach, Michigan. The shape of Lake Huron, combined with the decreased surface friction of water allowed northwesterly winds the unimpeded ability to intensify. Sailors reported waves reaching at least 35 feet (10.7 m) in height.

On the afternoon of 9 November, Hydrus passed, and exchanged signals with the freighter J. F. Durston. A further possible sighting of Hydrus was made that same day by the captain of the freighter Hurlbut W. Smith, near the mouth of Saginaw Bay. She eventually sank, killing her entire crew of 25. (Note: Brown reports the number of lives lost aboard Hydrus as 25. Other sources list the number of dead as 23, or 24.)

=== Aftermath ===
Twelve ships sank during the storm of 1913, eight of them on Lake Huron. Hydrus was a $200,000 ($4.66 million in 2024) loss to her owners, with financial losses due to vessel destruction or damage from the storm totaling $3,055,000 ($71.1 million in 2024). (Note: The Marine Review valued Hydrus at $136,000 ($3.17 million in 2024), and her cargo at $28,000 ($651,844 in 2024).) In the aftermath of the storm, wreckage and bodies from Hydrus began drifting ashore. The Lake Carriers Association offered a reward of $25 ($582.00 in 2024) for the recovery of each individual body.

On 16 November 1913, Hydrus' no. 1 lifeboat drifted ashore 3 miles (4.8 km) north of Kincardine, Ontario. The lifeboat showed no sign of use, with Captain E. O. Whitney, chairman of the Lake Carriers Association surmising it had been torn free from its davits. Another lifeboat, containing five crewmen, was discovered near Kincardine.

The first body from Hydrus was recovered on 23 November, 14 miles (22.5 km) north of Southampton, Ontario. The clothing and condition of the hands indicated the body belonged to a fireman. The third body to be found and the first to be identified belonged to steward Roy A. Sommerville, and was recovered near Southampton on 25 November. A fourth unidentified body was also recovered that day. By 29 November, three further bodies had been identified. Two of them, Kerno and Leslie Christy, an oiler and fireman from respectively, were claimed by their father. The third body belonged to handyman John Van Wynsberghe.

By 9 December 1913, two further bodies had been recovered near Oliphant, Ontario, and were taken to Wiarton, Ontario, for identification. One of the bodies was identified as W. J. Burns, an oiler aboard Hydrus. By 13 December, the previously misidentified body of C. G. Crab, a steward, and the body of Second Mate W. R. Newman had been identified.

Several bodies from Hydrus drifted ashore on Saugeen First Nation territory and were never recovered, due to superstitions surrounding physical contact with the dead among Indigenous people.

== Wreck ==
Drawing of Hydrus' wreck

The wreck of Hydrus was located northeast of Pointe Aux Barques in July 2015 by a team of shipwreck hunters led by David Trotter, who had been searching for her for 30 years. The wreck was positively identified thanks to a painted sign in the engine room, reading "Hydrus". Her wreck rests in over 160 feet (48.8 m) of water 32 miles (51.5 km) off shore, and is heavily encrusted with zebra mussels. It is upright and intact, though the hull has been damaged and the bow is twisted at a 45-degree angle from the rest of the ship. The holds still contain iron ore, and the pilothouse is intact, complete with the ship's wheel and engine-room telegraph stuck in the "ahead" position. The port anchor, engine room skylight and stern ventilator cowls are missing.

Russ Green, the deputy superintendent of the Thunder Bay National Marine Sanctuary referred to Hydrus as an "iconic shipwreck" and a "great find". She had previously ranked tenth in Canadian maritime historian Cris Kohl's list of the 25 most sought-after shipwrecks on the Great Lakes.

== Sources ==
- "254 Lake Dead – Relief Needed". The Cleveland Leader. 15 November 1913. p. 1 – via Newspapers.com.
- "Aground and Released". The Plain Dealer. Cleveland. 11 November 1905. p. 8 – via Newspapers.com.
- "Another Body Found". The Cleveland Leader. 27 November 1913. p. 7 – via Newspapers.com.
- "Beautiful New Steamer Launched at Lorain Yard". The Sandusky Star-Journal. Sandusky, Ohio. 12 September 1903. p. 6 – via Newspapers.com.
- "Big Rush for Grain Cargoes". The Plain Dealer. Cleveland. 28 November 1905. p. 12 – via Newspapers.com.
- Bowlus, W. Bruce (2010). Iron Ore Transport on the Great Lakes: The Development of a Delivery System to Feed American Industry. Jefferson, North Carolina: McFarland & Company, Inc. ISBN 978-0-786433-26-1.
- Boyer, Dwight (1984) [1971]. True tales of the Great Lakes. New York City: Dodd, Mead and Company. ISBN 978-0-396063-72-8.
- Brown, David G. (2004) [2002]. White Hurricane: A Great Lakes November Gale and America's Deadliest Maritime Disaster. Columbus, Ohio: International Marine / McGraw-Hill. ISBN 978-0-071380-37-9.
- Bugbee, Gordon P. (February 1962a). "Iron Merchant Ships: An Upper Lakes Centennial - Part One" (PDF). Telescope. 11 (2). Detroit: Great Lakes Maritime Institute: 24–27 – via Maritime History of the Great Lakes.
- Bugbee, Gordon P. (March 1962b). "Iron Merchant Ships: An Upper Lakes Cenntenial – Part Two" (PDF). Telescope. 11 (3). Detroit: Great Lakes Maritime Institute: 46–51 – via Maritime History of the Great Lakes.
- "Bulk Freighters Built Since 1902". The Marine Review. 42 (2). Cleveland: The Marine Review: 65. February 1912 – via Maritime History of the Great Lakes.
- "Captain Makes Report". The Cleveland Leader. 28 November 1913. p. 5 – via Newspapers.com.
- "Capt. Who Weathered Big Gale on Lake Superior". The Cleveland Leader. 2 December 1905. p. 5 – via Newspapers.com.
- "Channel System of Ship Construction". The Marine Review. 11 (18). Cleveland: The Marine Review: 6. 2 May 1895 – via Maritime History of the Great Lakes.
- "Channel System of Construction". The Marine Review. 12 (12). Cleveland: 13–22. 12 September 1895 – via Maritime History of the Great Lakes.
- "Choctaw Shipwreck Site National Register of Historic Places Registration Form" (PDF). Washington D.C.: National Park Service. 2018. Archived from the original (PDF) on 1 January 2019.
- "Duluth – Superior Arrivals". The Duluth News Tribune. Duluth, Minnesota. 3 November 1913. p. 2 – via Newspapers.com.
- "End Lake Signals as Storm Rages". The Plain Dealer. Cleveland. 9 December 1913. p. 17 – via Newspapers.com.
- "Father Identifies Bodies". The Plain Dealer. Cleveland. 29 November 1913. p. 11 – via Newspapers.com.
- Fessenden, Maris (10 November 2015). "Divers Discover 102-Year-Old Shipwreck in Lake Huron". Smithsonian Magazine. Washington D. C.: Smithsonian Institution.
- "Gilchrist Fleet Sold at Auction". The Marine Review. 43 (3). Cleveland: The Marine Review: 118. March 1913 – via Maritime History of the Great Lakes.
- "Gilchrist Will Have 75 New Boats". Detroit Free Press. 8 October 1902. p. 9 – via Newspapers.com.
- Green, Fred W. (1912). "Mitchell & Co.'s Marine Directory of the Great Lakes – 1912". Cleveland: Bureau Veritas – via Maritime History of the Great Lakes.
- Herriman, H. N. (1912). "Great Lakes Register – For the Construction and Classification of Steel and Wooden Vessels – 1912". Chicago: Lakeside Press – via Maritime History of the Great Lakes.
- "Identify Two Bodies". The Plain Dealer. Cleveland. 13 December 1913. p. 11 – via Newspapers.com.
- "Interlake Steamship Co". The Marine Review. 43 (5). Cleveland: The Marine Review: 184-185. May 1913 – via Maritime History of the Great Lakes.
- Kohl, Cris (2008). The Great Lakes Diving Guide (2nd ed.). West Chicago: Seawolf Communications. ISBN 978-0-9679-9769-8.
- "Lake Marine News". Minneapolis Daily Times. 10 October 1903. p. 9 – via Newspapers.com.
- "Lake Superior". The Plain Dealer. Cleveland. 4 November 1913. p. 11 – via Newspapers.com.
- "Lake Superior". The Plain Dealer. Cleveland. 7 November 1913. p. 11 – via Newspapers.com.
- Lyons, S. A. (1956). "The J. H. Sheadle in the Great Storm of 1913". Inland Seas. 12 (1). Toledo, Ohio: Great Lakes Historical Society: 16–22 – via National Museum of the Great Lakes.
- "Marine Notes". The Sandusky Star-Journal. Sandusky, Ohio. 11 September 1903. p. 6 – via Newspapers.com.
- "Marine Notes". The Plain Dealer. Cleveland. 6 October 1903. p. 10 – via Newspapers.com.
- "Marine Notes". Detroit Free Press. 29 January 1910. p. 10 – via Newspapers.com.
- "Marine Notes". The Plain Dealer. Cleveland. 27 August 1910. p. 9 – via Newspapers.com.
- "Maritime Affairs". The Cleveland Leader. 13 September 1903. p. 15 – via Newspapers.com.
- Meier, Skip (August 2013). "Interlake Steamship Company Celebrates Centennial – Part II". The Detroit Marine Historian. 66 (12). Marine Historical Society of Detroit: 3–6 – via Maritime History of the Great Lakes.
- Richards, Donald F. (November 1963). "The Great Storm – A 50th Anniversary Casualty List" (PDF). Telescope. 12 (11). Detroit: Great Lakes Maritime Institute: 247–253 – via Maritime History of the Great Lakes.
- Rudnick, Greg (2016). "Great Lakes News – November". Inland Seas. 72 (1). Toledo, Ohio: Great Lakes Historical Society: 73–80 – via National Museum of the Great Lakes.
- "Sailors Met Death in Sight of Shore". The Plain Dealer. Cleveland. 29 November 1905. p. 1–2 – via Newspapers.com.
- "Sault Ste. Marie". Detroit Free Press. 10 November 1913. p. 10 – via Newspapers.com.
- Schaefer, Jim (9 November 2015). "Man Discovers Lake Huron Shipwreck Missing Since 1913". Detroit Free Press.
- "Schuck Held Up". The Evening Telegram. Superior, Wisconsin. 3 May 1906. p. 4 – via Newspapers.com.
- "Schuck in Commission". The Cleveland Leader. 6 October 1903. p. 9 – via Newspapers.com.
- "Schuck, R. E." Bowling Green, Ohio: Bowling Green State University. Archived from the original on 31 March 2025 – via Historical Collections of the Great Lakes.
- "Schuck to Be Launched". The Cleveland Leader. 5 September 1903. p. 3 – via Newspapers.com.
- Schumacher, Michael (2013). November's Fury: The Deadly Great Lakes Hurricane of 1913. Minneapolis: University of Minnesota Press. ISBN 978-0-816687-20-6.
- "Score of Vessels Wrecked in Storm on the Great Lakes". The Cleveland Leader. 29 December 1905. p. 1 – via Newspapers.com.
- "Ship of the Month No. 137: W. C. Franz". Toronto: Toronto Marine Historical Society. April 1985 – via Maritime History of the Great Lakes.
- "Ship of the Month No. 168: Saskadoc". The Scanner. 21 (2). Toronto, Ontario: Toronto Marine Historical Society: 7–11. November 1988 – via Maritime History of the Great Lakes.
- "Ship of the Month No. 236: Scotiadoc". The Scanner. 29 (9). Toronto: Toronto Marine Historical Society: 6 – 12. 1997 – via Maritime History of the Great Lakes.
- "Ships Shelter as Gale Hits Lakes". The Plain Dealer. Cleveland. 25 November 1913. p. 11 – via Newspapers.com.
- "Steamer Schuck Launched". The Plain Dealer. Cleveland. 13 September 1903. p. 8 – via Newspapers.com.
- Stonehouse, Frederick (1990) [1984]. Went Missing, II. Au Train, Michigan: Avery Color Studios. ISBN 978-0-932212-37-5.
- "Strikers Returned to Work". Detroit Free Press. 4 May 1906. p. 9 – via Newspapers.com.
- "The Greatest Storm in Lake History". The Marine Review. 43 (12). Cleveland: The Marine Review: 430-444. December 1913 – via Maritime History of the Great Lakes.
- Thompson, Mark L. (1994). Queen of the Lakes. Detroit: Wayne State University Press. ISBN 0-8143-2393-6.
- "Three Bodies Recovered". The Cleveland Leader. 26 November 1913. p. 6 – via Newspapers.com.
- "Trace of Hydrus Found". The Plain Dealer. Cleveland. 17 November 1913. p. 1 – via Newspapers.com.
- "Two Steamers Are in Trouble". The Cleveland Leader. 17 October 1904. p. 4 – via Newspapers.com.
- "Tyrone is Punctured". Detroit Free Press. 5 May 1910. p. 10 – via Newspapers.com.
- "Vessel Passages". The Duluth News Tribune. Duluth, Minnesota. 8 October 1903. p. 10 – via Newspapers.com.
- "Vessel Passages". The Duluth News Tribune. Duluth, Minnesota. 12 October 1903. p. 5 – via Newspapers.com.
- "Will Be Launched Saturday". The Plain Dealer. Cleveland. 10 September 1903. p. 4 – via Newspapers.com.
- Witsil, Frank (2025). "Lost in Lake Huron for More Than 100 Years, the Carruthers is Finally Found". Detroit Free Press.
