= SS J. H. G. Hagarty =

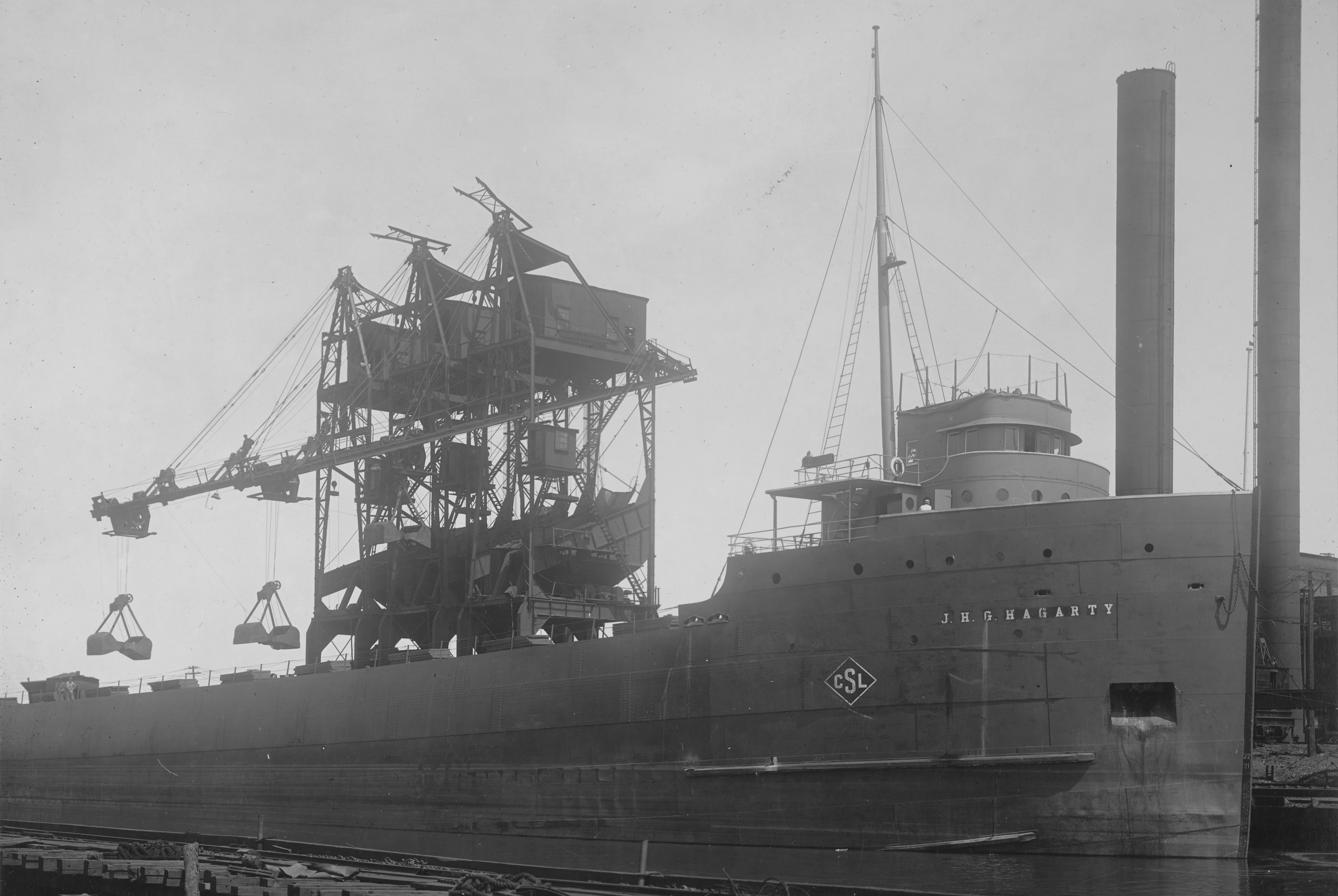
- J.H.G. Hagarty

History

Canada
- Name: J.H.G. Hagarty 1914-1926; Hagarty 1926-1968
- Operator: St. Lawrence & Chicago Steam Navigation Company 1914-1916; Canada Steamship Lines 1916-1968
- Port of registry: Canada, Toronto, Ontario
- Builder: Collingwood Shipbuilding Company
- Yard number: 42
- Launched: June 18, 1914
- In service: July 28, 1914
- Out of service: October 28, 1968
- Identification: C134250
- Fate: Scrapped in 1968, in Santander, Spain
- Notes: The Hagarty was the sister ship of the ill-fated James Carruthers

General characteristics
- Tonnage: 7,462 gross 5,704 net
- Length: 550 ft (170 m)
- Beam: 58 ft (18 m)
- Height: 31 ft (9.4 m)
- Installed power: 2× Scotch marine boilers
- Propulsion: 2,400 horsepower triple expansion steam engine

The J.H.G. Hagarty was a 550-foot (170 m) Canadian Great Lakes freighter that served from her launching in 1914 to her scrapping in 1968. The Hagarty was used to haul bulk cargoes such as iron ore, coal, grain and occasionally limestone. She had a length of 550-feet, a beam of 58-feet and a height of 31-feet. She was powered by a 2,400 horsepower triple expansion steam engine and fueled by two coal-fired Scotch marine boilers.

== History ==
The Hagarty was constructed in 1914 by the Collingwood Shipbuilding Company of Collingwood, Ontario for the St. Lawrence & Chicago Steam Navigation Company of Toronto, Ontario. The Hagarty was the sister ship of the ill-fated James Carruthers that was lost in the Great Lakes Storm of 1913.

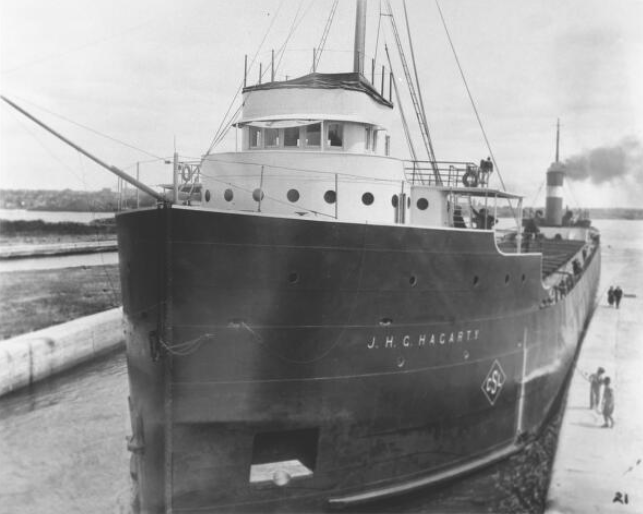
The J.H.G. Hagarty in the Soo Locks

The Hagarty would have her telescoping steel hatch covers replaced with single piece spruce hatch covers, she also had her cabins, decks removed and replaced. This delayed her launch for several months. Her owners believed that the design of the Carruthers contributed to her foundering. This was thought because the steamer Howard M. Hanna Jr. which was badly damaged in the storm had been taken to Collingwood, Ontario for repairs. John Leich, the yard's superintendent had a few things to say when the Hanna arrived in Collingwood. The Hanna had suffered severe cracks in her hull, she did not break in two completely, however her cabins had taken severe damage. He also pointed out that: "The starboard side of the forecastle has been stove in with heavy seas and the structure there shows how lightly she was built." Leich said this was exactly what they wanted to avoid with the redesigning of the Hagarty.

The Hagarty entered service on July 28, 1914, clearing Collingwood running only on ballast bound for Detroit, Michigan where she entered the Great Lakes Engineering Works' Ecorse, Michigan drydock for repairs caused by her launching.

On July 27, 1916, the St. Lawrence & Chicago Steam Navigation Company's fleet was sold to the Canada Steamship Lines Ltd. of Montreal, Quebec. In 1926 she was renamed Hagarty.

== Scrapping ==
In 1968 the Hagarty was sold to the Steel Factors Ltd. She was later resold to a Spanish scrapyard. She departed Toronto, Ontario, for Kingston, Ontario on May 15, 1968, in tow of tugs Graeme Stewart and G.W. Rogers. She parred down the St. Lawrence Seaway with the steamer Collingwood towed by the tugs James Battles and the Salvage Monarch. They arrived in Santander, Spain on October 28, 1968, for scrapping.
