= Off-the-grid =

Not being connected to public utilities

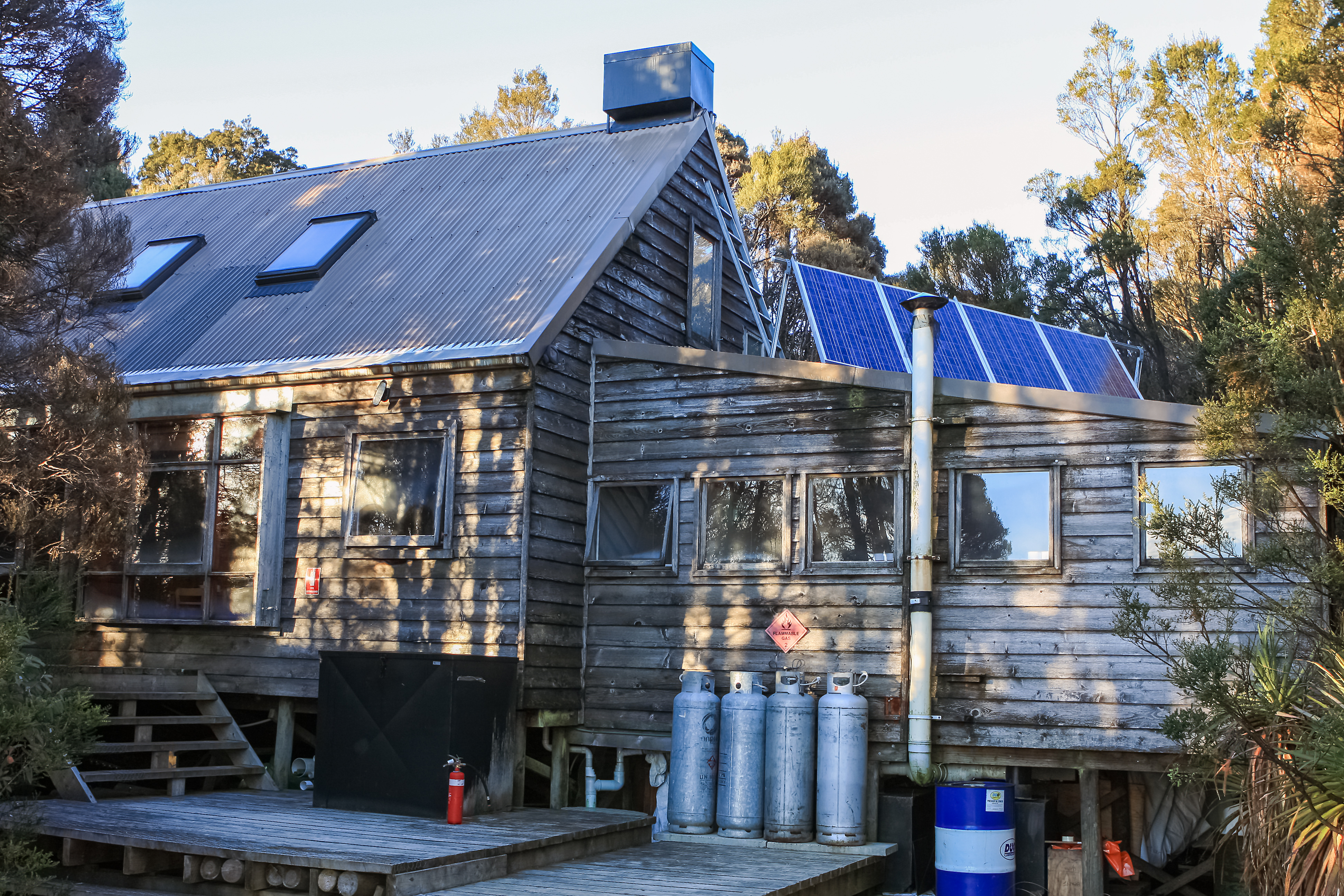
A house using solar panels and rainwater harvesting

Off-the-grid or off-grid is a characteristic of buildings and a lifestyle designed in an independent manner without reliance on one or more public utilities. The term "off-the-grid" traditionally refers to not being connected to the electrical grid, but can also include other utilities like water, gas, and sewer systems, and can scale from residential homes to small communities. Off-the-grid living allows for buildings and people to be self-sufficient, which is advantageous in isolated locations where normal utilities cannot reach and is attractive to those who want to reduce environmental impact and cost of living. Generally, an off-grid building must be able to supply energy and potable water for itself, as well as manage food, waste and wastewater.

== Energy ==
Energy for electrical power and heating can be derived from burning hydrocarbons (e.g., diesel generators, propane heating), or generated on-site with renewable energy sources such as solar (particularly with photovoltaics), wind, or micro hydro. Additional forms of energy include biomass, commonly in the form of wood, waste, and alcohol fuels and geothermal energy, which uses differences in the underground temperature to regular indoor air environments in buildings. It is possible to simply eliminate energy shortage (e.g., via solar and wind tech such as in Old Order Amish - while used and sanctioned, not all agree) and Old Order Mennonite communities, and many Amish people still use steam engines.

=== Electrical power ===
Grid-connected buildings receive electricity from power plants, which mainly use natural resources such as coal and natural gas as energy to convert into electrical power. 2017's breakdown of world energy sources shows that the globe, mainly dependent on grid power, uses a majority of non-renewables, while popular renewables such as solar PV and wind power are a small portion. When off the grid, such as in Africa where 55% people of do not have access to electricity, buildings and homes must take advantage of the renewable energy sources around them, because it is the most abundant and allows for self-sufficiency.

==== Solar photovoltaics ====
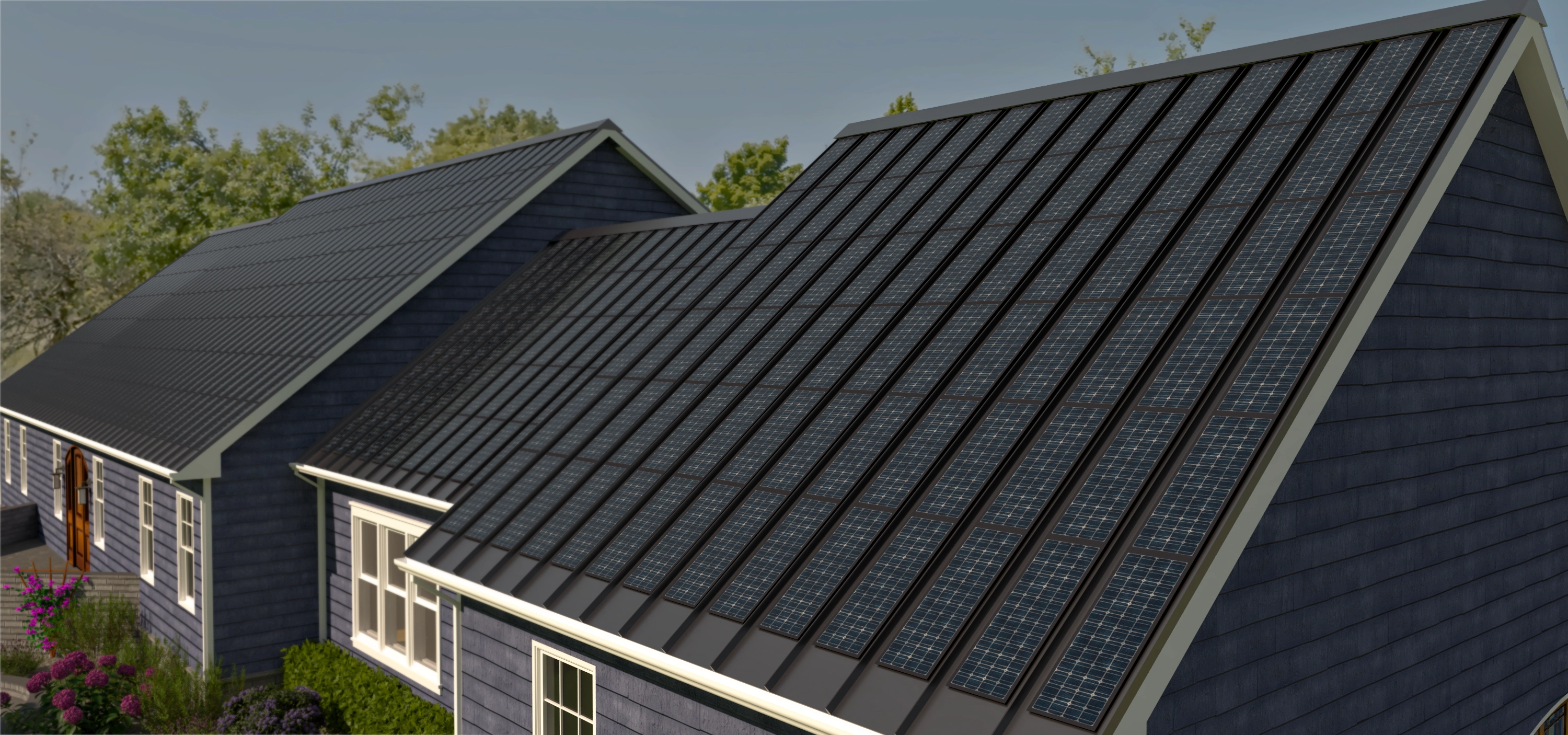
3D sketch of thin film solar on standing seam metal roof

Solar photovoltaics (PV), which use energy from the sun, are one of the most popular energy solutions for off-grid buildings. PV arrays (solar panels) allow for energy from the sun to be converted into electrical energy. PV is dependent upon solar radiation and ambient temperature. Other components needed in a PV system include charge controllers, inverters, and rapid shutdown controls. These systems give off-grid sites the ability to generate energy without grid connection. Every quarter, Bloomberg New Energy Finance evaluates manufacturers on their actual projects over the previous quarter and publish a list of Tier 1 Solar Module (panel) Manufacturers.

==== Wind turbines ====
Wind energy can be harnessed by wind turbines. Wind turbines components consist of blades that get pushed by wind, gearboxes, controllers, generators, brakes, and a tower. The amount of mechanical power captured from a wind turbine is a factor of the wind speed, air density, blade rotational area, and the aerodynamic power coefficient of the turbine.

==== Micro-hydro ====
Where water is abundant, hydropower is a promising energy solution. Large scale hydropower involves a dam and reservoir, and small scale micro-hydro can use turbines in rivers with constant levels of water. The amount of mechanical power generated is a factor of the flow of the stream, turbine size, water density, and power coefficient, similar to wind turbines. The energy from waves and tides can also provide power to coastal areas.

==== Batteries ====
When renewables produce energy that is not currently needed, the electrical energy is usually directed to charge a battery. This solves intermittency issues caused by the non-constant production of renewables and allows for variations in building loads. See here for an illustration of how to size an off-grid Solar PV and Battery system. Common batteries include the lead-acid battery and lithium-ion battery. There are portable batteries and non-portable batteries. These portable power stations are often used in remote areas, since they don't require installation and can be used in a variety of scenarios. The technology of these portable batteries has evolved much through the years. Most of the portable power stations use two types of lithium-ion batteries: nickel manganese cobalt and lithium iron phosphate batteries.

==== Hybrid energy systems ====
In order to protect against intermittency issues and system failures, many off-grid communities create hybrid energy systems. These combine traditional renewables like solar PV, and wind, micro-hydro, batteries or even diesel generators. This can be cheaper and more effective than extending or maintaining grids to isolated communities.

==== Radioisotope thermoelectric generator ====
Historically remote applications such as lighthouses, weather stations and the likes which draw a small but continuous amount of power were powered by radioisotope thermoelectric generators (RTGs) with the needed radioisotopes either extracted from spent nuclear fuel or produced in dedicated facilities. Both the Soviet Union and the United States employed numerous such devices on earth and almost every deep space probe reaching beyond the orbit of Mars (and even some in the inner solar system) has had an RTG to provide power where solar panels no longer deliver sufficient electricity per unit of mass.

==== Direct current buildings ====
Electricity produced by photovoltaics is direct current and is stored in batteries as direct current and DC buildings would eliminate the need for conversions from AC to DC. One third of electricity in the home is used as DC for electronics, LED lights, and other appliances already. The market for DC home appliances is maturing, which is necessary to have a 100% DC powered home. The electrical panel, circuit breakers, and fuses would need to be replaced with DC compatible components if retrofitting an AC house to DC. For net metering, to sell back to the grid, an inverter would still be needed, and also to use the grid-as-a-backup, if still using a grid-tied electrical system. DC electricity doesn't transmit over power lines efficiently over long distances, but if it is generated and stored in batteries on site, it is more efficient by 10-20 percent to keep it as DC and run appliances that way without inverting.

== Temperature control ==
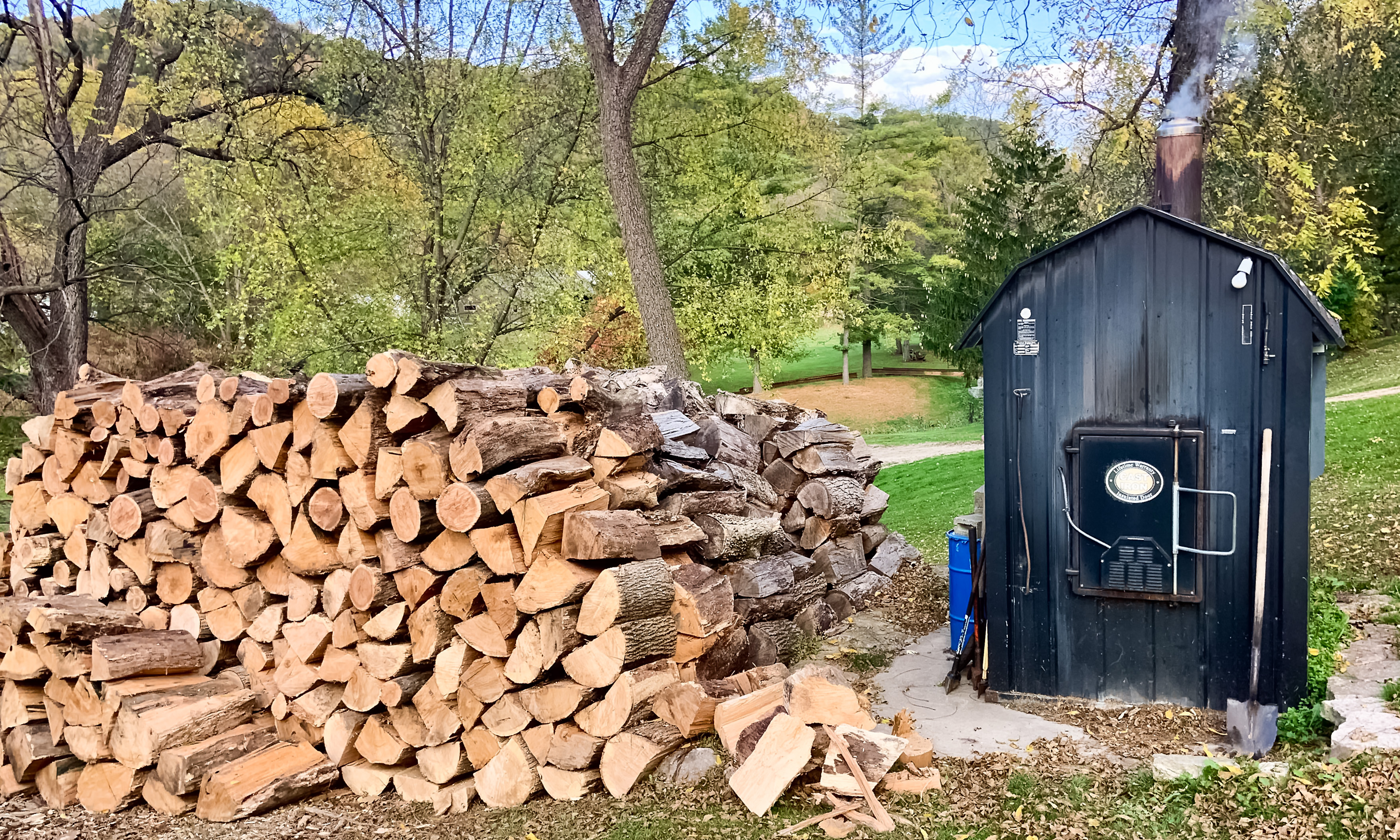
Outdoor wood-fired boiler

Types of solar-energy passive off-grid cooling systems could be used for cooling houses and/or refrigeration – including some that do not require electrical components and are allowing for chemically stored on-demand energy. Such may be useful for climate change mitigation and adaptation.

== Communications ==
Meshnets such as B.A.T.M.A.N. could be used to sustain or establish communications without conventional infrastructure. Moreover, off-grid communications technologies could be used for environmental, security and agricultural monitoring as well as for emergency communications and coordination – such as for work assignation.

== Healthcare ==
According to the CDC off-the-grid and rural lifestyles face significantly more health challenges than those living in urban life, and even face significantly higher chances of death compared to their urban counterparts due to challenges accessing proper care. Off-grid technologies can also be used to improve healthcare systems, allowing for more reliable energy sources for health care facilities, power everything from lights to essential life-saving equipment. Drones have been used for off-grid healthcare, especially in the most remote regions of the world. With communications enabled, they deliver test samples, medicine, vaccines, food, water, and anti-venoms.

== Waste management ==
Small-scale waste management techniques in Western Europe, often for specific or standardized waste, were reported to mostly use one of two main strategies: aerobic (with plants) and anaerobic treatment (with biogas production).

== Water and sanitation ==
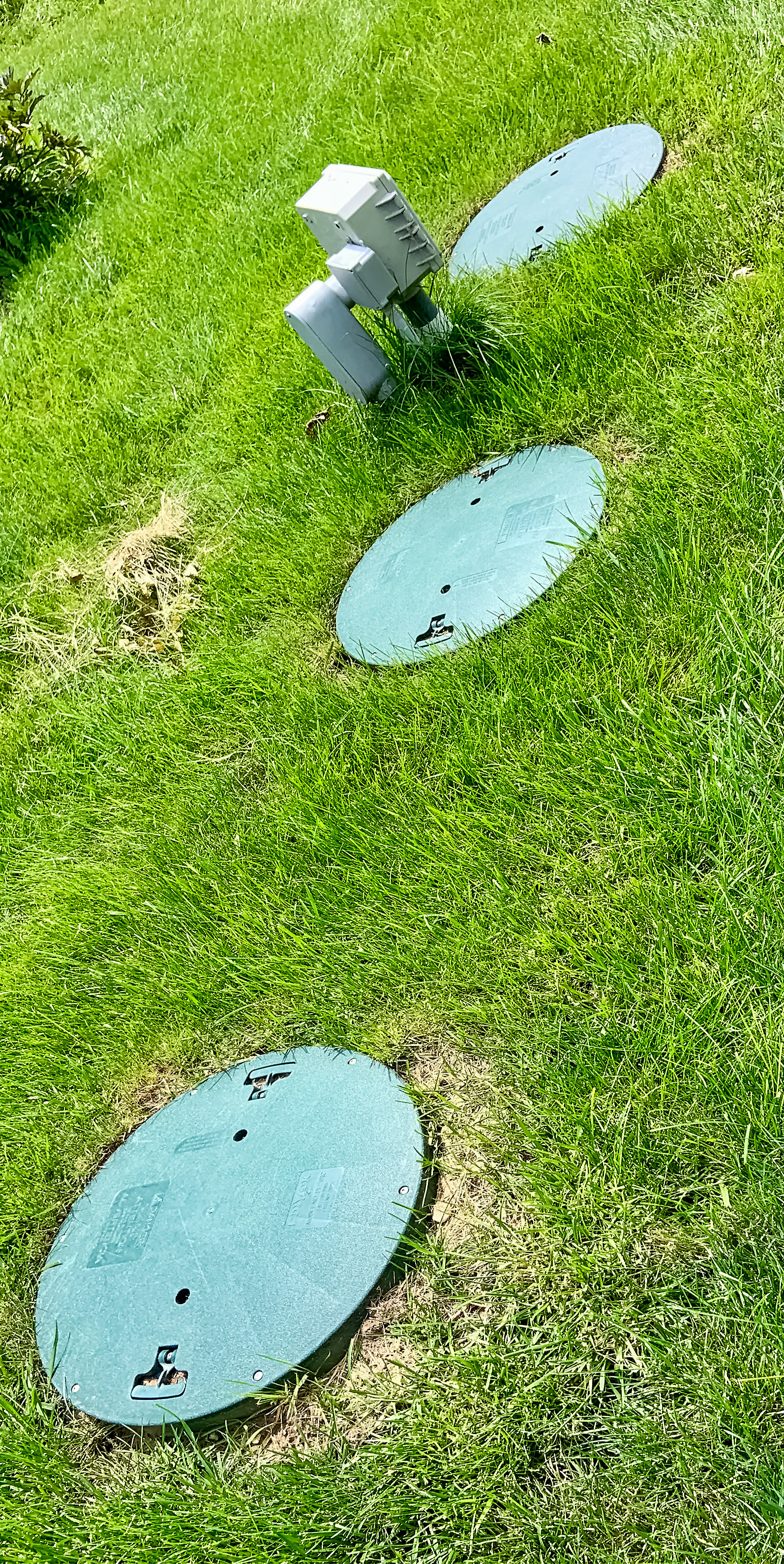
Septic tank system

Water is a crucial consideration in the off-grid environment, which must be collected, used, and disposed of efficiently to make use of the environment. There are many ways to supply water for indoor domestic use, which vary based on local access and preference.

=== Sources ===
==== Local water bodies ====
Nearby streams, ponds, rivers, and lakes are easy access points for fresh water. Oceans can also be considered with proper desalination.

==== Wells and springs ====
This traditional method involves digging down to where water is present and abundant underground, usually to the water table or to an aquifer, and bringing it up for use, or collecting at springs where underground water comes to the surface. Systems for bringing underground water to buildings include wind and solar driven pumps or hand pumps. Well water should be tested on a regular basis and when changes in the water's taste, odor, or appearance occur to ensure its quality.

==== Rain catchments ====
This system relies on the weather to provide water. Catchment systems are designed based on the water demand of the users and local rainfall characteristics. Rain water is typically funneled from the roof of a building to water tanks where the water is stored until needed.

==== Foreign supplies ====
Another, less self-sufficient method involves bringing large amounts of clean water to the site where it is stored. This system relies on access to clean drinking water elsewhere and transportation to the off-grid site.

==== Devices ====
Atmospheric water generators have a large potential for off-the-grid water generation.

=== Treatment ===
Wherever the water does come from, it must be safe to drink and use indoors. For various issues with water quality, different water treatment strategies are available.

==== Filtration ====
A physical barrier allows water to pass through and blocks impurities in the water and, if the filter is fine enough, can filter out biological contaminants.

==== Chemical treatment ====
In order to disinfect water, such as chlorine, chlorine dioxide, and ozone are introduced which kill microorganisms.

==== Ultraviolet light (UV) ====
A UV system uses bulbs that emit ultraviolet light into filtered water to kill all types of viruses, bacteria, and protozoa.

==== Electrochemically activated solutions ====
A less typical approach, this involves applying a current to water that has a small salt solution added to disinfect biological contaminants. Combined with filtration, this is a means to provide safe drinking water.

==== Desalination ====
Some groundwater may have high salinity levels and can be non-potable, which is fixed through distillation. Coastal communities may benefit by getting water from the ocean through the use of desalination plants that remove salt.

==== Water softening ====
The presence of certain minerals in water creates hard water which can clog pipes over time, interfere with soap and detergents, and can leave scum on glasses and dishes. Water softening systems introduce sodium and potassium ions which make the hard minerals precipitate.

=== Usage and sanitation ===
For off-grid buildings, efficient use of water is needed to prevent water supplies from running out. While this is ultimately habit-dependent, measures involve low-flow fixtures for faucets, shower heads, and toilets which decreases the flow rate of faucets or the volume of water per flush to reduce total water used. Water can be eliminated in toilets through the uses of a composting toilet. Automatic leak detectors and tap closures can reduce amounts of wasted water. Greywater recycling can further save on water by reusing water from faucets, showers, dishwashers, and clothes washers. This is done through storing and treating the grey water, which can then be reused as a non-potable water source.

If an off-grid home is not connected to a sewer system, a wastewater system must also be included. On-site wastewater management is usually done through storage and leaching. This involves storing greywater and blackwater in a septic tank or aeration tank to be treated, which is connected to a leaching field that slowly allows the water to percolate out into the ground. While more and expensive waste water treatment options are also available, this is a common reliable means to dispose of waste water without polluting the environment.

== Environmental impact and sustainability ==
Because off-grid buildings and communities mainly rely on upon renewable energy, off-grid living is generally good for the environment with little negative impact. Hybrid energy systems also provide communities with a sustainable way to live without the dependence and cost of being connected to public infrastructure which can be unreliable in developing countries. Generally, isolated concerns of environmental impacts are the use diesel generators, which produce greenhouse gases, batteries, which use many resources to make and can be hazardous, and pollution in natural environments from solid waste and wastewater. It is prudent to note that, while the concerns below address negative environmental impacts, going off-grid as a whole is a viable option to help reduce impacts on the environment when replacing grid-connected buildings that contribute global warming and climate change.

=== Diesel generator concerns in Canadian off-grid communities ===
Canada has about 175 aboriginal and northern off-grid communities, defined as "a community that is neither connected to the North American electrical grid nor to the piped natural gas network; it is permanent or long-term (5 years or more), and the settlements have at least 10 permanent buildings." Aboriginal Affairs and Northern Development Canada lists the following environmental concerns for these off-grid communities:

- Burning large amounts of diesel produces substantial greenhouse gas emissions. This contributes to climate change which negatively affects communities.
- Fuel must be transported long distances by airplane, truck or barge, leading to a greater risk of fuel spills.
- The transportation of fuel by trucks on winter roads impacts the environment negatively through high greenhouse gas emissions from the vehicles.
- Fuel spills may take place while the fuel is being transported and stored, posing environmental risks.
- Fuel tank leaks contaminate soil and groundwater.
- Generators can be noisy and disruptive, especially in quiet, remote communities.
- Emissions from diesel generators could contribute to health problems in community members.

The environmental impacts of the systems used in off-grid buildings must also be considered due to embodied energy, embodied carbon, choice and source of materials, which can contribute to world issues such as climate change, air, water, and soil pollution, resource depletion and more.

=== Sustainable communities ===
The concept of a sustainable off-grid community must take into consideration the basic needs of all who live in the community. To become truly self-sufficient, the community would need to provide all of its own electrical power, food, shelter and water. Using renewable energy, an on-site water source, sustainable agriculture and vertical farming techniques is paramount in taking a community off the grid. To grow the community you simply add neighborhoods using the same model as the first. A self-sustained community reduces its impact on the environment by controlling its waste and carbon footprint.

=== Economic consideration ===
In situations where grid parity has been reached, it becomes cheaper to generate one's own electricity rather than purchasing it from the grid. This depends on equipment costs, the availability of renewable energy sources, and the cost of a grid connection. For example, in certain remote areas a grid connection would be prohibitively expensive, resulting in grid parity being reached immediately.When Grid Parity is reached immediately, it forces residents in these areas into a forced-off-the-grid lifestyle and removes the possibility of extensive economic development. ^{[1]}

It is often done to residential buildings only occasionally occupied, such as vacation cabins, to avoid high initial costs of traditional utility connections. Other people choose to live in houses where the cost of outside utilities is prohibitive, or such a distance away as to be impractical. The two main kinds of off-gridders are: those who live off the grid because they are determined to generate their own energy and fuels (including food), and those who had to settle for living off the grid because of immediate grid parity or because the grid was simply too far and expensive to connect to. However, those in the first group are the rarest, leaving those in the second group off the grid not by choice but because of a mix of economic and lifestyle necessities.

==== Off-grid power for marginalized communities ====
Reliable centralized electricity systems have provided supply constancy which has bolstered societies and their economies. Electricity provides opportunities for improved productivity, learning, and hygienic end-uses in the home, such as cooking without the use of polluting biomass fuel sources, yet as of 2016, 20 percent of people worldwide lived without it. Bridging the gap from the current under-provision of grid electricity to universal access has been projected to require US$17 trillion and 30 years even on a rigorous timetable. Researchers have argued that a lack of centralized energy infrastructure can result in low resilience to damage to productivity and property from changing climates and severe weather. In addition, the advantages of central power generation and distribution are receding in the face of climatic degradation due to fossil fuel powered generation, vulnerabilities to extreme weather events and electronic manipulation, and increasingly complex design and regulatory processes.

Decentralized, off-grid energy systems can constitute a sustainable interim alternative to extending national grids to rural customers. Those using limited off-grid power as a stepping stool to eventual grid access can accumulate energy efficient knowledge, behavior, and products that confer added resiliency while grid networks increase in reliability and carbon neutrality. However, providing off-grid electricity to rural users without also including training and education about its use and applications can result in under-utilization. To counteract this possibility, off-grid systems should reflect the cultural structures, values, and mores of host communities.

Off-grid electrical systems can power individual residences or a community linked in a shared arrangement known as a micro-grid. In addition, they may be powered by renewable energy sources or by conventional fossil fuels. In Kenya, Mpeketoni township began a community-based, diesel-powered micro-grid project (the Mpeketoni Electricity Project [MEP]) in 1994 with an outlay of approximately US$40,000, and eventually grew to serve 105 residences and 116 commercial, educational, government, and healthcare buildings. The MEP demonstrated unanticipated supply and demand effects when artisans using tools powered by MEP electricity increased their productivity enough to cause depreciation of their wares, necessitating lowering of their prices; however, higher volumes of sales eventually offset these losses. MEP electricity facilitated cold storage of agricultural products, in addition to well pumping, which allowed students who previously spent several hours per day fetching water to spend that time studying in the evening by electric light. Electricity provided by the MEP also expanded teaching hours and sanitation at local schools through electric lighting and pumped water. The MEP off-grid project had numerous direct and indirect benefits for community members, and because the MEP emphasized promotion of the uses for electricity and the community had the ability to pay nominal rates for its use, the project achieved 94 percent cost recovery in its first ten years of operation.

== Relation to alternatives ==
Off-the-grid generation may sometimes inhibit efforts to develop permanent infrastructure – such as in the case of devices for water generation and permanent piped water supply networks. Furthermore, grids may often be substantially more efficient and effective or necessary – such as in the case of smart grids and super grids for sustainable energy – and hence may often only be useful on large scales for autonomous community development of alternatives, as fallback, for disaster response, for other humanitarian aid during temporary relocation, and for initial support of long-term infrastructure development.

== Land labs as off-grid educational environments ==
Land labs provide an outdoor classroom environment for students to learn about off-grid technology and methods. Within a land lab, students can learn about permaculture, photovoltaics, rainwater catchment, animal husbandry, composting, market gardening, biochar systems, methane digesters, rocket mass heaters, horticulture, ecology, and countless other off-grid concepts.

Public schools, charter schools, private schools and homeschools can all benefit from using a land lab environment to teach students about sustainability, independence, and ecological systems.

== See also ==
- Anarcho-primitivism
- Autonomous building
- Back-to-the-land movement
- Battery charger
- Camping
- Developing country § Common challenges
- Distributed generation
- Domestic energy consumption
- Hazards of outdoor recreation
- Human-wildlife conflict
- Inverter
- Microgeneration
- Passive house
- Rural electrification
- Rural-urban fringe
- Simple living
- Slab City, California
- Soft power
- Solar charge controller
- Solar Guerrilla
- Survival skills
- Survivalism
- Wide area synchronous grid
- Wildland-urban interface
- Zero energy building

== Gallery ==
Wiring diagram for a hybrid wind/PV system

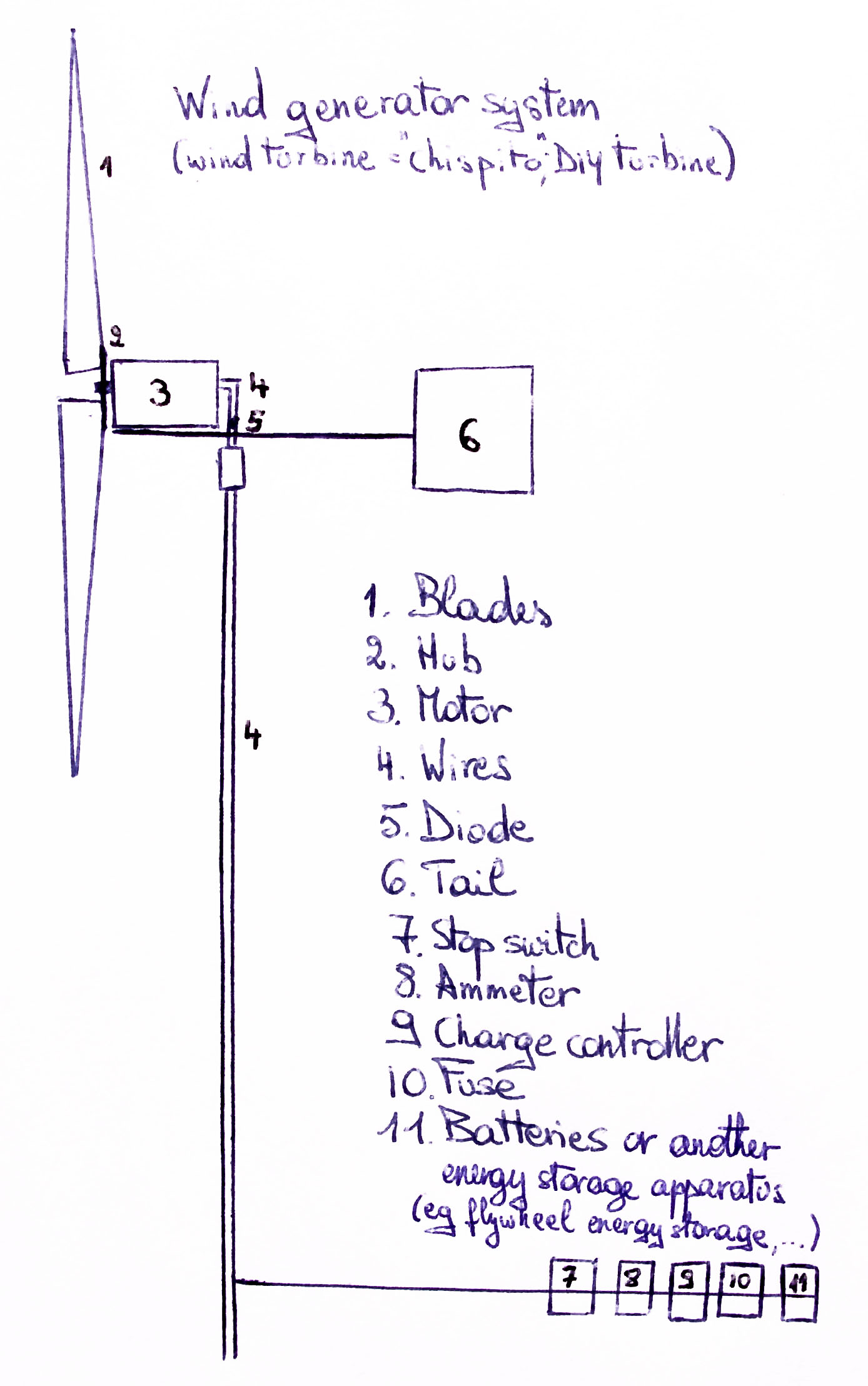
Incomplete DIY Wind generator system

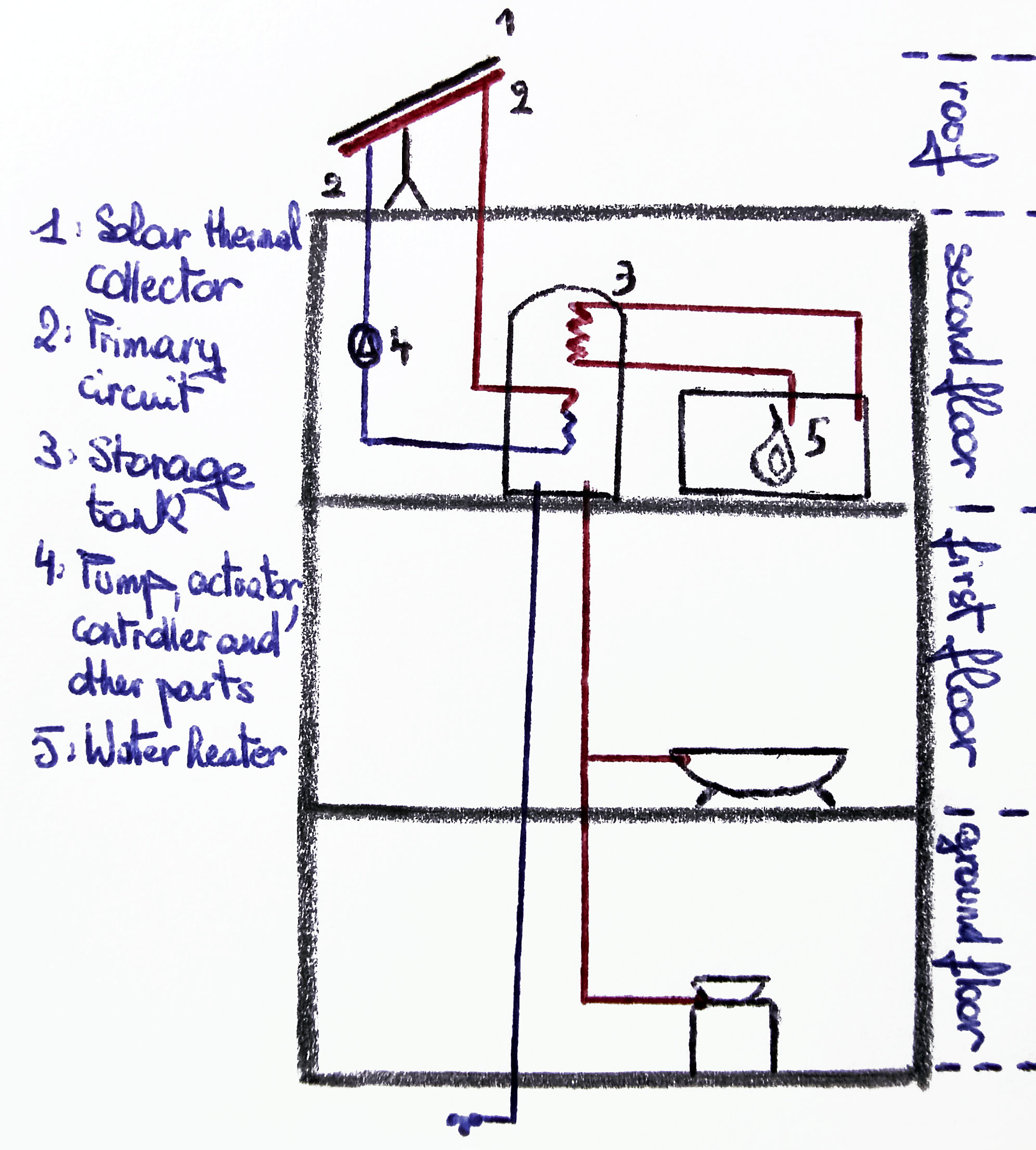
Schematic of an active solar heating system

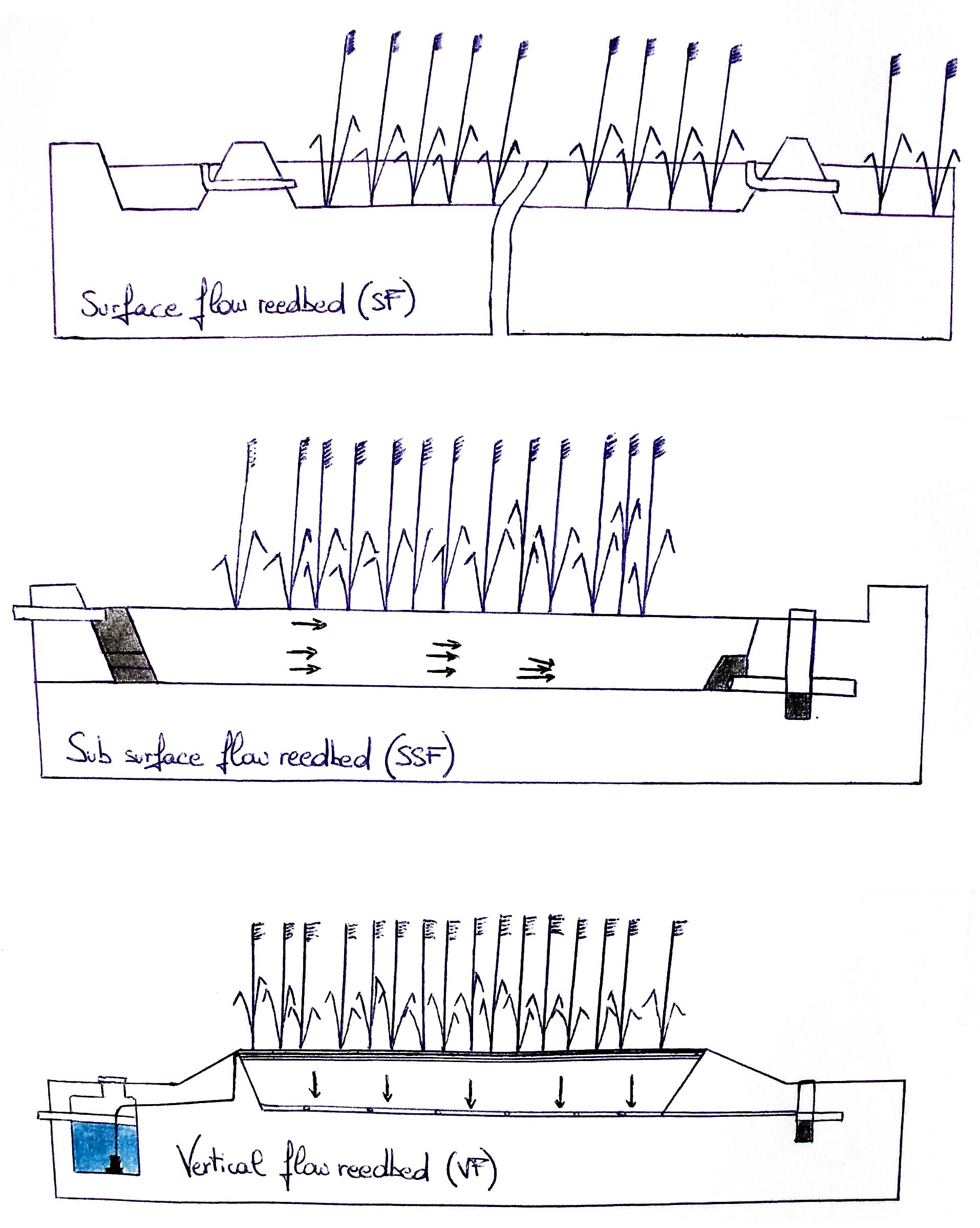
Treatment ponds can be used for purifying water.

Heat and cold storage may be combined with heat pumps for use in the domestic greenhouse or to heat the house itself.

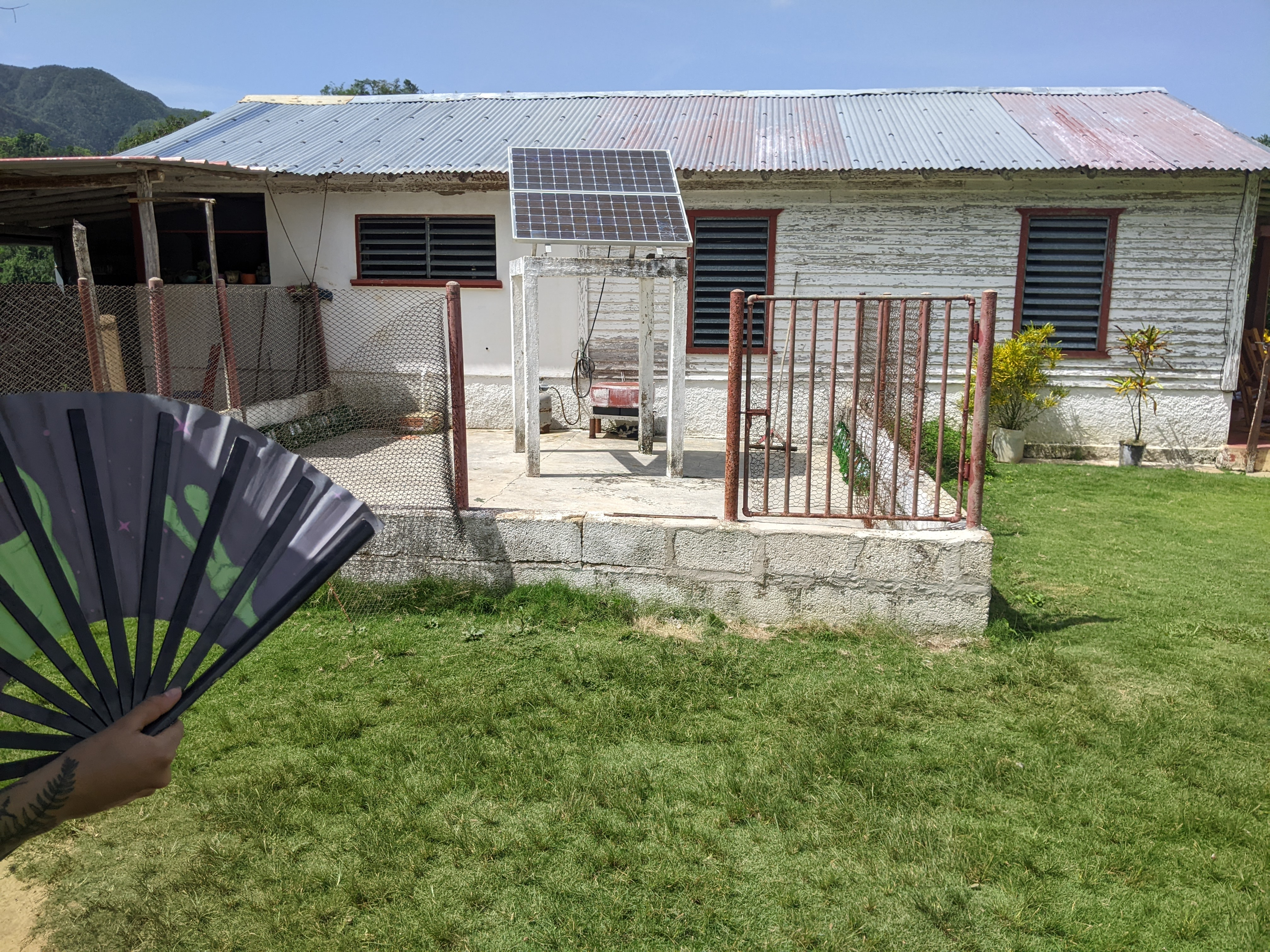
A makeshift power station in Cuba, consisting of a lead-acid battery, a solar panel, and a controller
