= Boiler design =

Process of designing steam boilers

Sections of a steam locomotive showing the many fire-tubes which carry the hot gases of the fire through the boiler to heat the water and so create steam.

Boiler design is the process of designing boilers used for various purposes. The main function of a boiler is to heat water to generate steam. Steam produced in a boiler can be used for a variety of purposes including space heating, sterilisation, drying, humidification and power generation. The temperature or condition of steam required for these applications is different, so boiler designs vary accordingly.

== Modern design benefits ==
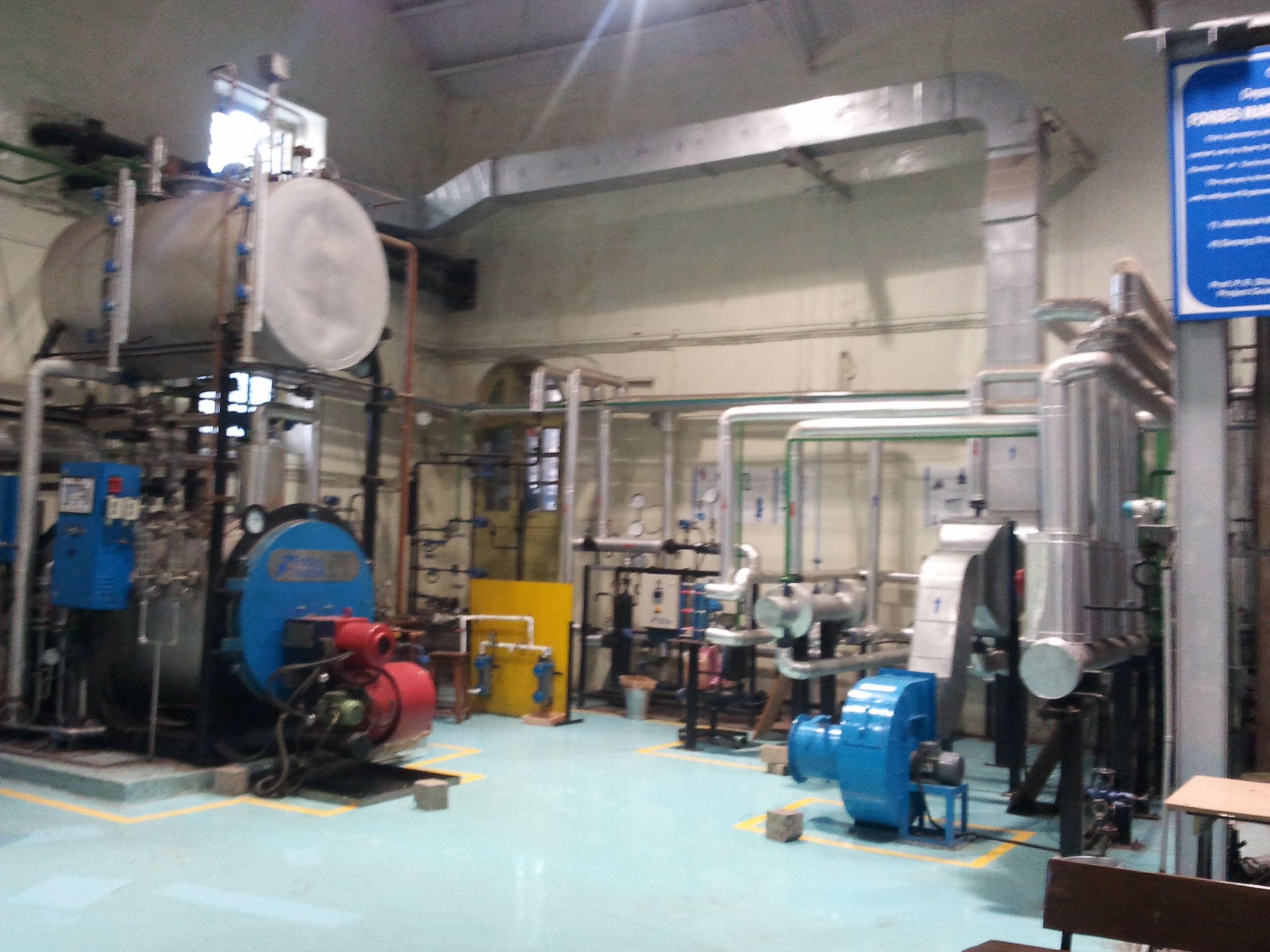
Boiler in the steam technology center at College of Engineering, Pune

Modern boiler design offers several benefits. In the past, improper design of boilers has caused explosions which led to loss of life and property. Modern designs attempt to avoid such mishaps. Further, mathematical modeling can determine how much space a boiler will need and the type of materials to be used. When the design specifications of a boiler are determined, design engineers can estimate a cost and time schedule for the construction.

Boiler design may be based upon:

- Production of a maximum quantity of steam with minimal fuel consumption
- Economic feasibility of installation
- Minimal operator attention required during operation
- Capability for quick starting
- Conformity to safety regulations
- Quality of raw water : how hard or soft the water is will determine the material of the boiler.
- Heat source - the fuel to be burned and its ash properties or the process material from which the heat is to be recovered.
- Capacity/steam output required, usually measured in tonnes per hour or kg/s.
- Steam condition - pressure, temperature, etc.
- Safety considerations
- Mechanical constraints
- Cost restrictions
- Monetary cost
- Tensile strength of material must be considered while using any joining processes.

Accessories and mountings are devices which form an integral part of boiler but are not mounted on it. They include economizers, superheaters, feed pumps and air pre-heaters. Accessories help in controlling and running the boiler efficiently. Certain common mountings (specifically those required by the Indian Boiler Act) include:

- Feed check valve - regulates the flow of water into the boiler and prevents the back flow of water in case of failure of the feed pump.
- Steam stop valve - regulates the flow of steam that is produced in the boiler to the steam pipe, and may also be used to stop the supply of steam from the boiler
- Fusible plug - placed at the lowest level of water and above the combustion chamber, its function is to extinguish the fire as soon as the water level in the shell of the boiler falls below a certain marked level.
- Blow-off cock - removes water from the shell at regular intervals to remove the various impurities that may be settled at the bottom of the shell.
- Safety valves - automatically prevent the steam pressure from exceeding safe levels
- Water-level indicators - indicate the level of water in the shell.

== Bibliography ==
- Malek, Mohammad A. (2005.) "Power boiler design, inspection, and repair: ASME code simplified." McGraw-Hill. ISBN
- Stromeyer, C.E. (1893.) "Marine boiler management and construction." Longmans, Green, and Co.
- Outdoor wood-fired boiler
