= SS Henry A. Hawgood =

Former American bulk steam freighter

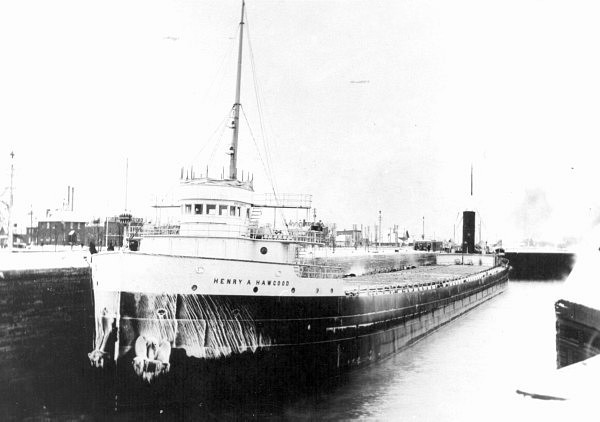
- The Henry A. Hawgood in the Soo Locks

History

United States
- Name: Henry A. Hawgood 1906-1912; C. Russel Hubbard 1915-1937; W.W. Holloway 1937-1986
- Operator: Minerva Steamship Company (A.H. Hawgood, Mgr.) 1906-1911; Commonwealth Steamship Company 1911-1911; Hubbard Steamship Company (W.C. Richardson, Mgr.) 1911-1920; Columbia Steamship Company (John T. Kelley, Mgr.) 1920-1931; Columbia Transportation Company 1931-1957; Oglebay Norton Corporation 1957-1986
- Port of registry: United States, Fairport, Ohio
- Builder: American Ship Building Company, Cleveland, Ohio
- Yard number: 435
- Launched: September 8, 1906
- In service: October 13, 1906
- Identification: U.S. Registry #203582; IMO number: 5384425
- Fate: Scrapped in Recife, Brazil on October 21, 1986
- Notes: The Hawgood was featured in the film Blues Brothers as the W.W. Holloway

General characteristics
- Class & type: Lake freighter
- Tonnage: 6,839 gross tons; 5,389 net tons
- Length: 552 ft (168 m) LOA; 532 ft (162 m) LBP
- Beam: 56 ft (17 m)
- Draft: 31 ft (9.4 m)
- Installed power: 1,760 horsepower triple expansion steam engine; diesel engine (after 1963)

The Henry A. Hawgood was an American steel-hulled, propeller-driven lake freighter that was built by the American Ship Building Company of Cleveland, Ohio for service on the Great Lakes of North America and Canada. She was used to haul bulk cargoes such as iron ore, coal and grain.

== History ==
The Hawgood was launched on September 8, 1906 as hull #435. She had a length of 552-feet, a beam of 56-feet and a depth of 31-feet. She was powered by a 1,760 horsepower triple expansion steam engine and fueled by two coal-fired Scotch marine boilers.

She was commissioned by the Minerva Steamship Company (managed by A.H. Hawgood) of Cleveland, Ohio. She entered service on October 13, 1906 clearing Cleveland, Ohio for Lake Superior. Her homeport was Fairport, Ohio. In 1911 the Hawgood was transferred to the Commonwealth Steamship Company of Cleveland, Ohio. Her career with the Commonwealth Steamship Company didn't last long, later that year she was sold to the Hubbard Steamship Company (managed by W.C. Richardson) of Cleveland, Ohio. The Hawgood stranded on Weis Beach, Lake Huron in the Great Lakes Storm of 1913. In 1915 the Hawgood was renamed C. Russel Hubbard. In 1920 the fleet owned by W.C. Richardson merged by the Columbia Steamship Company (managed by John T. Kelley) of Cleveland, Ohio. In 1931 fleet was reincorporated as the Columbia Transportation Company in Delaware.

== W.W. Holloway ==
The Hawgood was renamed W.W. Holloway in 1937. On July 25, 1945 the Holloway collided with the steamer Goderich on Lake Superior; both the Goderich and the Holloway sustained significant damage. In 1957 the Holloway was converted to a self-unloader by the Christy Corporation of Sturgeon Bay, Wisconsin. In 1963 the Holloway was repowered with a brand new diesel engine by the American Ship Building Company of Lorain, Ohio.

On April 15, 1963 the Holloway suffered a fire while in drydock at American Ship Building Company of Lorain, Ohio. The cost to repair the damage caused by the fire was about $15,000. On July 10, 1974 the Holloway ran aground in the Fighting Island Channel in the Detroit River. She was released by the tugs Vermont and Maine. She was towed to Ojibway Anchorage with steering problems.

On November 15, 1974 the Holloway struck a bank at Burns Harbor, Indiana which caused a lot of damage. On June 4, 1978 the Holloway struck an abutment at South Chicago. She sustained $224,000 in damage. In 1980 the Holloway was featured in the American film The Blues Brothers, when Elwood Blues jumped their 1974 Dodge over the open 95th Street drawbridge she was passing under.

On December 7, 1981 the Holloway was laid up in Toledo, Ohio never to sail again. In 1985 she was sold to the Marine Salvage Ltd. of Port Colborne, Ontario. Later that year the Holloway was sold to a Brazilian shipbreaker. On September 16, 1986 she cleared Quebec along with the steamer Philip D. Block in tow of the Polish tug Jantar. They arrived in Recife, Brazil on October 21, 1986.
