= SS J. H. Sheadle =

American Great Lakes freighter built in 1906

Coordinates: 46.568000°N 87.386167°W

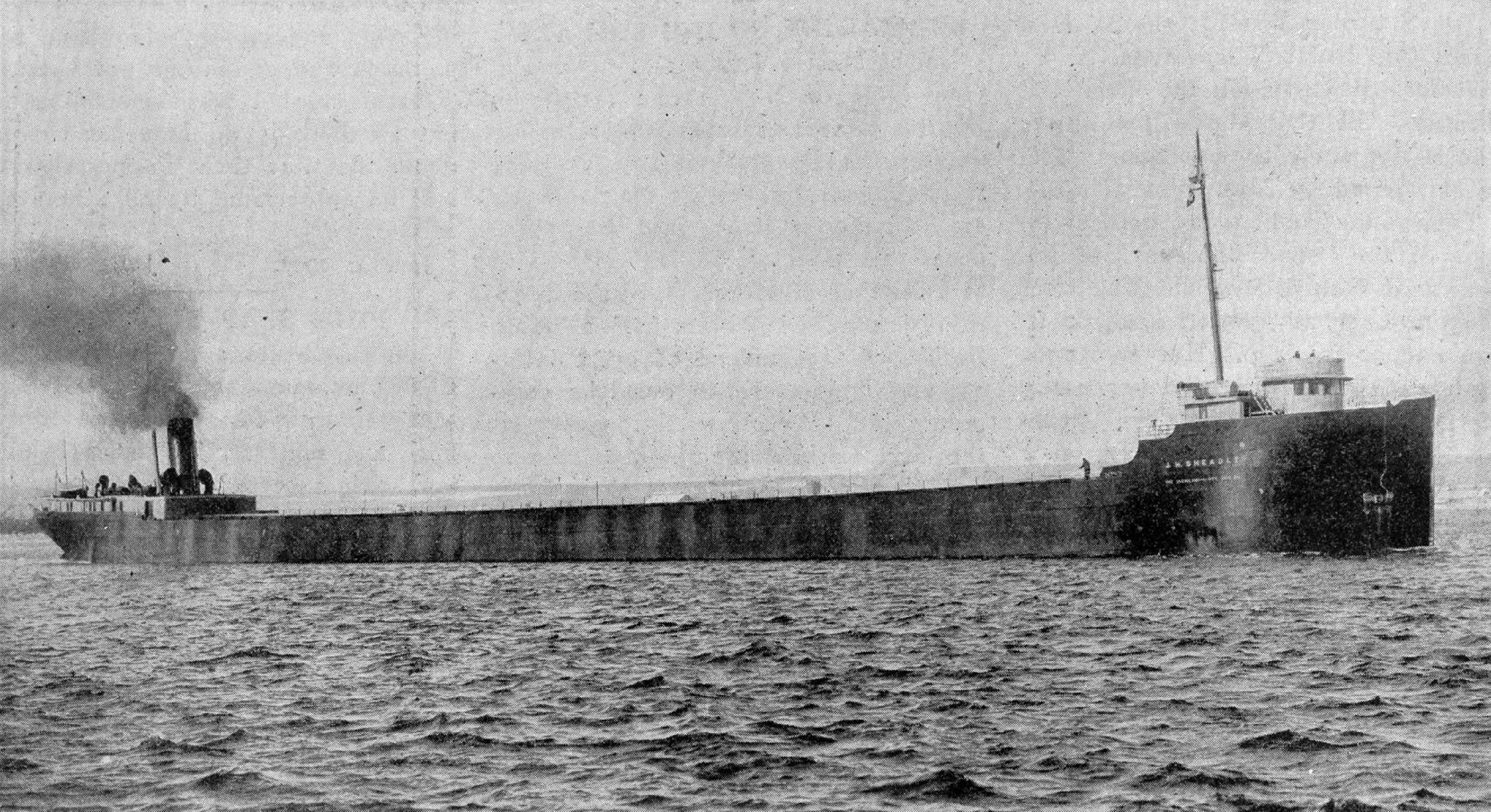

History

United States
- Name: J. H. Sheadle 1906-1924; F. A. Bailey 1924-1930; LaSalle 1930-1965; Meaford 1965-1979; Company 1979-1980
- Namesake: Jasper H. Sheadle
- Operator: Grand Island Steamship Company 1906-1921; Cleveland-Cliffs Steamship Company 1921-1924; Forest City Steamship Company 1924-1927; Cleveland-Cliffs Steamship Company 1927-1965; Upper Lakes Shipping Ltd. 1965-1979; Pierson Steamships Ltd. 1979-1980
- Port of registry: United States, Grand Island, Michigan
- Builder: Great Lakes Engineering Works, Ecorse, Michigan
- Yard number: 22
- Launched: September 29, 1906
- In service: October 25, 1906
- Out of service: June 11, 1980
- Identification: U.S. Registry #203628; IMO number: 5201130
- Fate: Scrapped in 1980, in Santander, Spain
- Notes: The Sheadle was the last vessel to see the ill-fated James Carruthers before she sank on Lake Huron

General characteristics
- Length: 550 ft (170 m)
- Beam: 56 ft (17 m)
- Height: 31 ft (9.4 m)
- Installed power: 2 x Scotch marine boilers
- Propulsion: 1,665 horsepower triple expansion steam engine
- Speed: 10 knots

The SS J. H. Sheadle was an American Great Lakes freighter built in 1906. She was built in Ecorse, Michigan, by the Great Lakes Engineering Works. She was owned by the Grand Island Steamship Company of Cleveland, Ohio. She had the identification number #203826. She was used to transport coal, iron ore and grain across the Great Lakes of North America and Canada.

== History ==
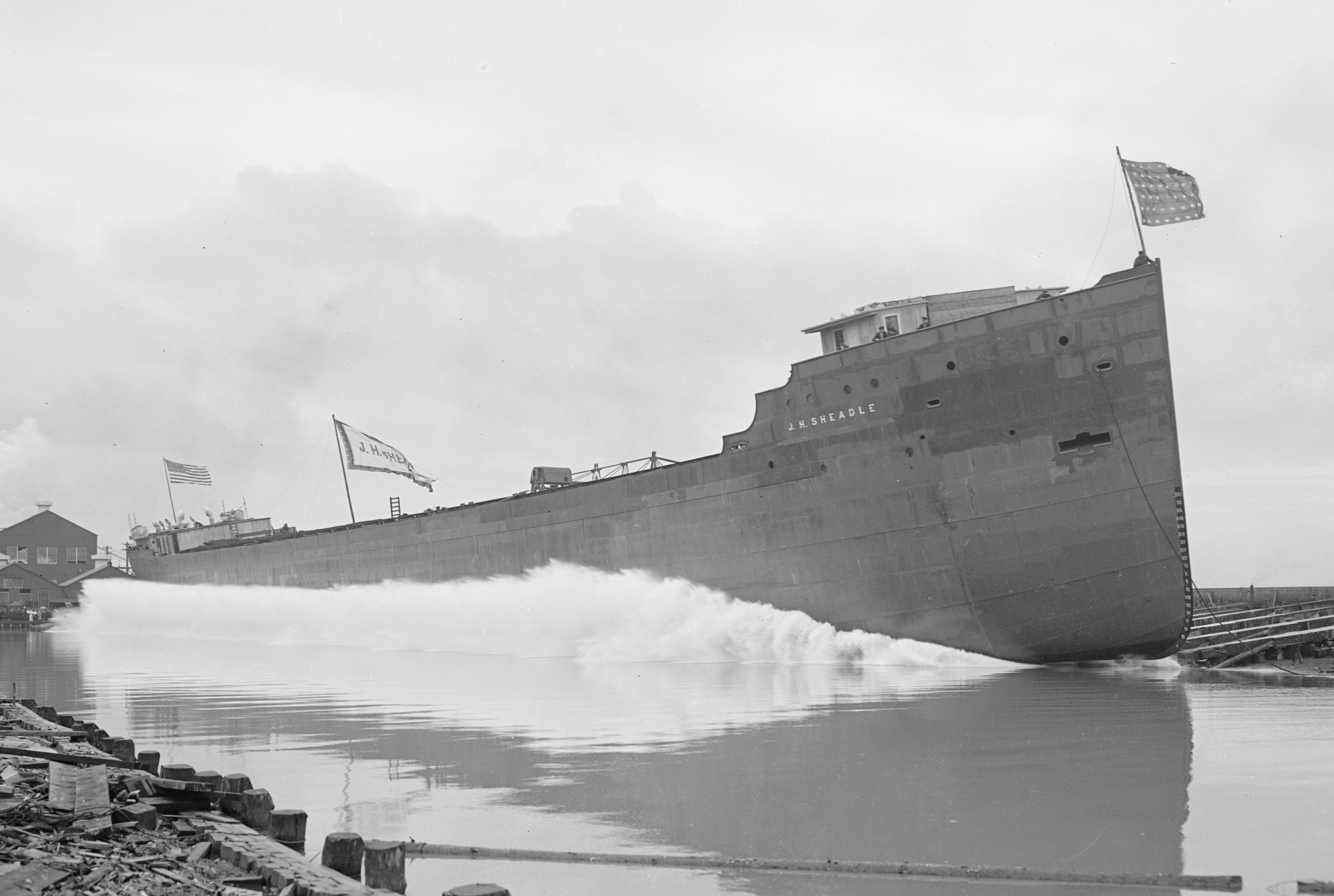
Launch of J. H. Sheadle

The Sheadle was built by the Great Lakes Engineering Works of Ecorse, Michigan, for the Grand Island Steamship Company of Cleveland, Ohio. She was launched on September 29, 1906, as hull #22. She was powered by a 1,665-horsepower triple-expansion steam engine and fueled by two Scotch marine boilers. She had a length of 550 feet, a beam of 56 feet and a height of 31 feet. On November 6, 1913, the Sheadle was downbound from Fort William to Erie, Pennsylvania. On that same day the Sheadle met up with another downbound freighter, the Canadian steamer James Carruthers off the shores of Georgian Bay. The Carruthers entered Lake Huron with the Sheadle behind her. They could see the lights of the Carruthers until she made a port turn to keep her south of Great Duck Island and on a strait line to Georgian Bay. The Sheadle grounded at Bar Point just below Amherstburg, Ontario, after suffering some storm damage. She remained grounded for about 5.2 hours, after which she managed to free herself. She finally arrived in Erie, Pennsylvania, on November 12.

The boat's steering gear failed on November 19, 1920, while backing from a dock at Marquette, Michigan she was loaded with iron ore at the time. She struck the rocks, tearing away her rudder and putting a large hole in tank number seven, causing her to settle to the bottom. She was raised and went into winter layup in Marquette. The amount of money required to repair the Sheadle was $150,000.

In 1924 she was purchased by the Forest City Steamship Co. of Cleveland, Ohio, and renamed F. A. Bailey. In 1928 she was sold to the Cleveland-Cliffs Steamship Company. In 1933 she was renamed LaSalle. She had a new tank top installed in 1936 and new side tanks installed March of 1949. The LaSalle was repowered with a DeLaval double reduction geared cross-compound steam turbine by American Ship Building Company of Lorain, Ohio.

== Canadian registry ==
The LaSalle was sold to the Upper Lakes Shipping Ltd., Toronto, Ontario, in 1965 and renamed Meaford. In May of 1979 the Meaford was purchased by the Soo River Company of Toronto and renamed Pierson Independent. The Independent's with the Soo River Company lasted only two months. She ran aground in the Brockville Narrows of the St. Lawrence River on October 28, 1979. After being freed, she was beached at Longbeach, Ontario, where her cargo of grain was loaded into the Mapletah and the E. J. Newberry. The tugs that came to aid her were the Robinson Bay and Daniel McAllister. The Pierson Independent was freed on October 31 and was dry docked at Port Weller on November 11. A survey revealed the damage was too extensive to justify repairs. The ship was declared a constructive total loss, and towed to Hamilton, Ontario, by the tug G.W. Rogers.

== Scrapping ==
She was sold to the Strathearne Terminals Ltd. of Hamilton, Ontario, in November. She was renamed Company and sold to a Spanish ship breakers the following spring. She was towed out of Hamilton, Ontario, on May 2, 1980, by the tugs Cathy McAllister and the Salvage Monarch. She arrived in the scrapyard in Santander, Spain on May 11, 1980.
