= Grate firing =

Grate firing is a type of industrial combustion system used for solid fuels. It now is used mainly for burning waste and biomass, but also for smaller coal furnaces.

- Capacities 0.3 to 175 MWth in industry and CHP
- Fuel fired per grate area 1-2 MW/m^{2}, maximum grate area 100 m^{2}
- Grates are typical only suitable for coarse particles, for fine particles a spreader is required, increases max. capacity
- Primary air through the grate (also used for cooling) and secondary air

== Types ==
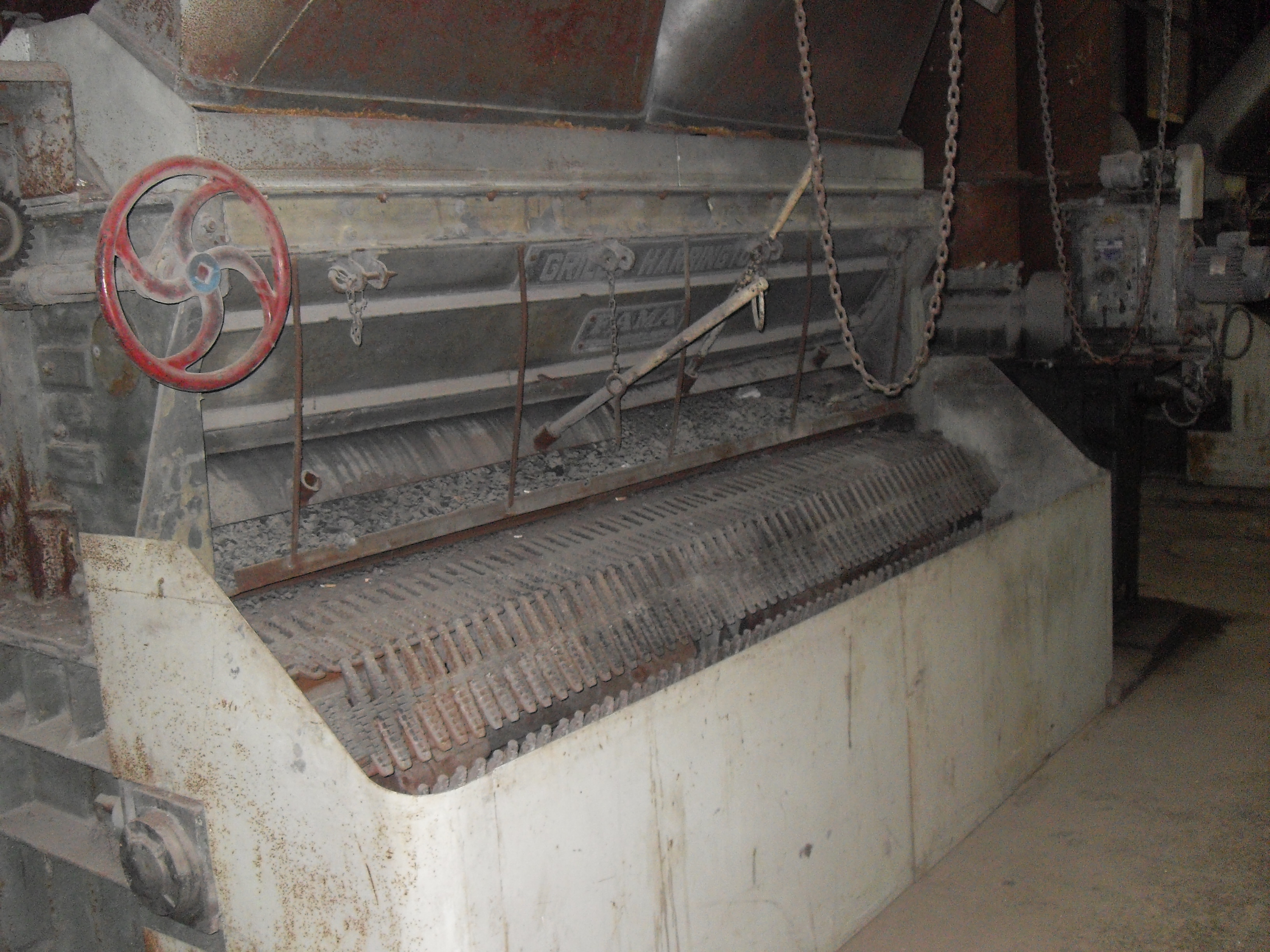
travelling grate in an old steam boiler

Until the 1930s, the Dutch oven was the primary technology used to improve combustion for low-quality or high-moisture fuels. It has largely been replaced by the following:

Travelling grate
A moving grate which is covered with a fuel layer, 10-30 cm. Power control by means of varying the grate velocity

Reciprocating grate
For ash-rich, low calorific fuels like municipal waste, arrangement of stationary and moving grates -> conveying and mixing (forward-moving type or reverse-action grate)

Vibrating grate
Water cooled membrane wall, with holes for air. For burning coal or wood.

== Grate area ==
The grate area is the area of the grate (length x width). The larger the grate area, the more fuel can be burned per hour. The amount of fuel burned also depends on the fuel or bed movement velocity.

== See also ==
- Fluidised bed firing
- Pulverized fuel firing
