= Outdoor wood-fired boiler =

Variant of the wood stove

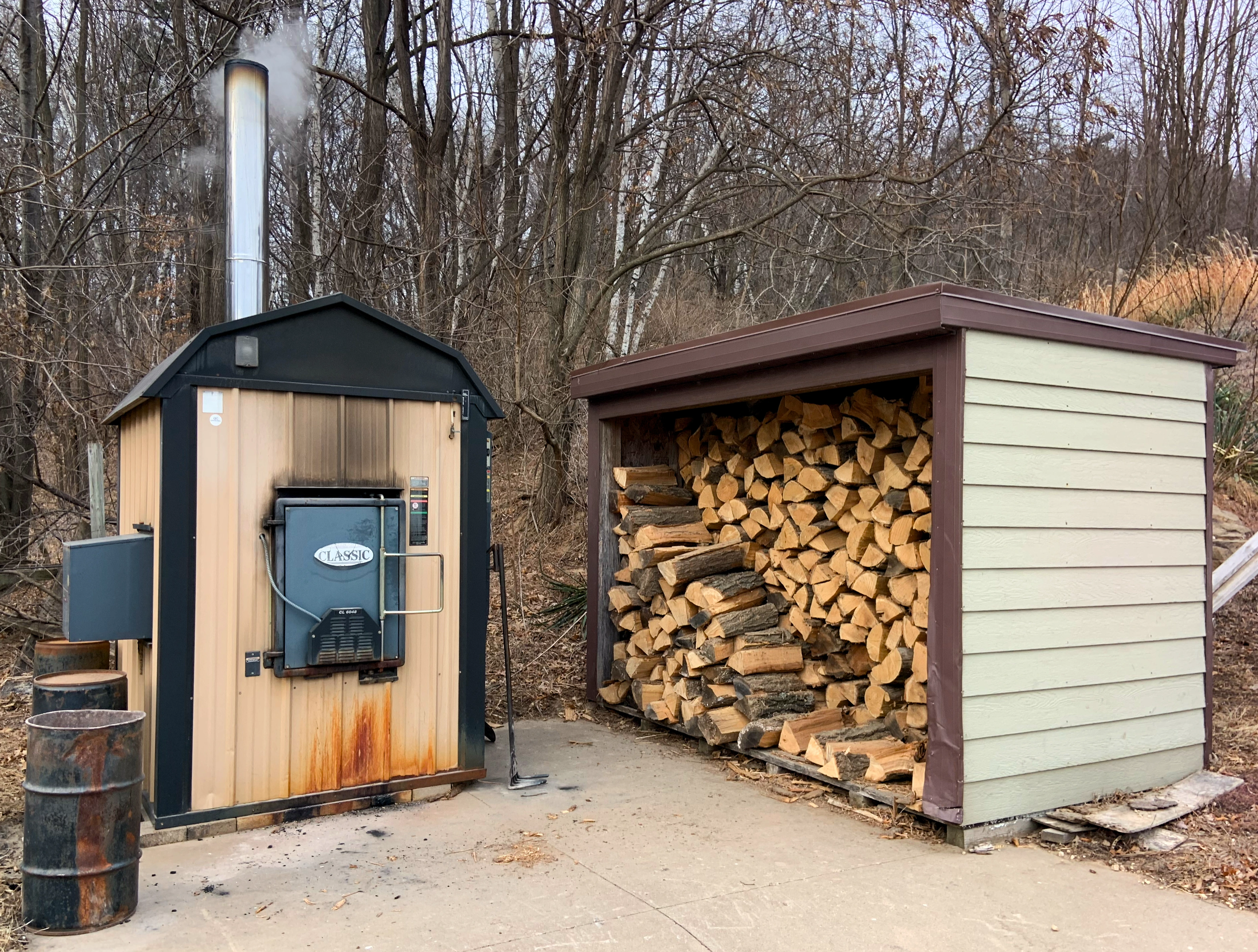
Outdoor wood-fired boiler

The outdoor wood boiler is a variant of the classic wood stove adapted for set-up outdoors while still transferring the heat to interior buildings.

== Technology ==
The outdoor wood boiler is a variant on the indoor wood, oil or gas boiler. An outdoor wood boiler or outdoor wood stove is a unit about 4-6 feet wide and around 10 feet long. It is made up of four main parts- the firebox, which can be either round or square, the water jacket, the heat exchanger, and the weather proof housing. The fire box ranges from 2 to 5 feet long and can be as tall as 4 feet. The firebox and heat exchanger are surrounded by water or a glycol-water solution, which absorb heat from the burning wood. The heated water is generally circulated through insulated underground lines to a heating load, where the heat can be transferred from the water to various heat emitters.

=== Standard outdoor wood furnaces ===
Standard outdoor wood boilers heat the firebox and the smoke goes out the exhaust straight. If not run hot enough, the exhaust gas will be thick and black, and the resulting ash will not be fully rendered. While functional, these models take more work and are far less efficient than some newer more efficient models.

The use of a Dutch oven or its modern equivalent, the fuel cell burner, can improve the combustion efficiency of a wood boiler. With this extension to the boiler, fuel can be up to 60% moisture and still combust efficiently.

=== Catalytic outdoor wood boilers ===
Some newer outdoor wood boilers have a catalytic converter installed, to allow for a more efficient burn and treatment of the exhaust before it leaves the unit. There is a considerable difference in cost between these and standard units. These are far less popular than gasification outdoor wood boilers.

=== Secondary combustion (gasification) outdoor wood boilers ===
How a gasification outdoor wood boiler works.

Gasifier wood boilers use secondary combustion air to burn additional wood gases. The most sophisticated systems use computer controls to direct air at different stages of the burn process at variable volume.

High efficiency outdoor wood boilers use down draft gasification must meet strict EPA Phase 2 Certification. Outdoor wood gasification boilers can burn between 30% - 50% less fuel than its traditional counterpart.

Outdoor wood boilers are a topic of environmental controversy. An improperly used or built outdoor wood boiler can produce wood smoke with excessive unburned particulate matter, but when properly burned, studies show that burning wood is still one of the most environmentally friendly heating options. In 2007, EPA began a voluntary program to encourage manufacturers to reduce particulate levels. In 2015, the U.S. EPA updated its clean air standards for residential wood heaters, this is a mandatory standard for sales in the United States. The revised regulations apply only to new products and will not affect existing wood heaters. At this point, the only boilers that pass these emission controls are gasification models.
