= Dutch oven (furnace) =

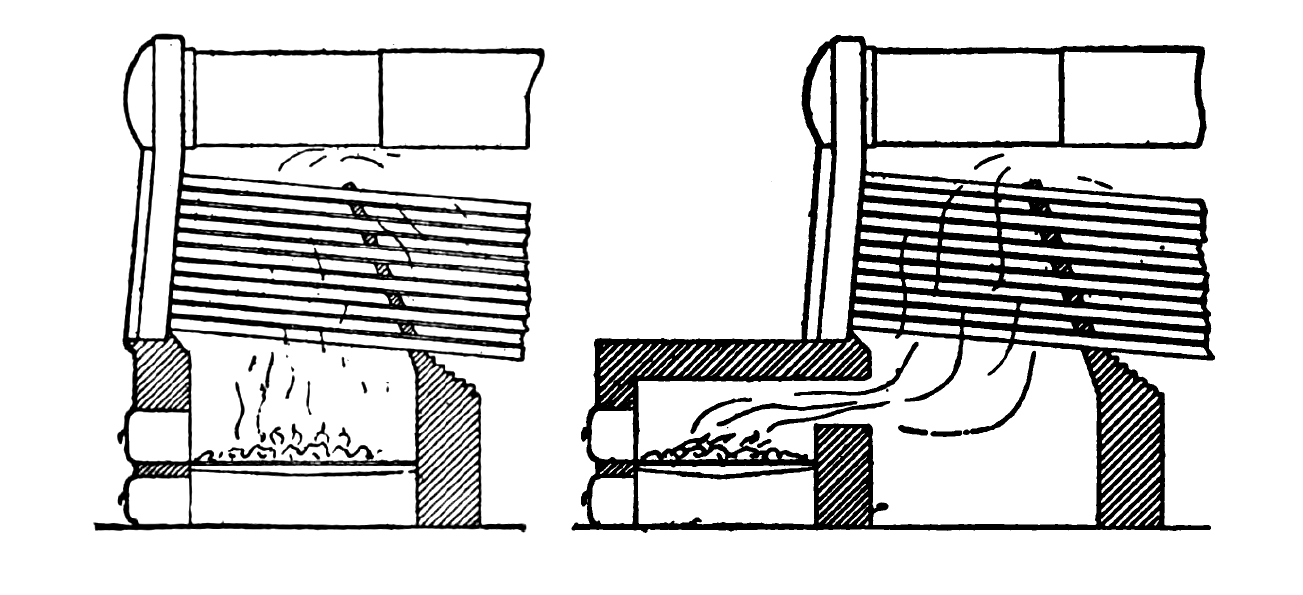
A traditionally designed water-tube boiler (left) and a water-tube boiler with a Dutch oven extension.

A Dutch oven is the name for an extension to the furnace of a horizontal water-tube boiler using low-quality or high-moisture fuel. They are useful primarily in hand-stoked boilers where low-quality or high-moisture fuel is burned. Largely superseded by modern technology, they are still used in the biomass fuel, forestry, and sugar industries.

== Operation ==
For a boiler to work a maximum efficiency, the boiler casing must be placed as close to the burning fuel as possible, so that the maximum amount of heat can be transferred to the boiler. But the boiler casing cannot be so close as to prevent the fuel from combusting as fully as possible. (Note: The heat of combustion causes the air to expand. Without adequate space to do so, additional combustion is delayed or impossible.)

The Dutch oven was generally used with hand-fired boilers. Placed at the front of the boiler, it is essentially an extension of the fire grate. Where lower-quality fuel such as bituminous coal or fuel with high moisture such as wood is burned, a Dutch oven is commonly used. (Note: When bituminous coal is burned, part of it is released as carbon monoxide and light hydrocarbon gas, both of which are easily combusted by the heat provided by the burning coal itself. Heavy hydrocarbons are also released, but these require higher heat and more time to break down before they can combust. If the furnace temperature is too high, a high draft will be created which will sweep the heavy hydrocarbons away before they can fully combust.) A Dutch oven can burn fuel with a moisture content as high as 60 percent. It provides both a larger combustion chamber and more space for air and volatile gases to thoroughly mix before reaching the relatively cooler boiler tubes.

The Dutch oven is lined with fire brick, because it creates extreme incandescent temperatures. This refractory surface also inhibits the absorption of heat by the oven. A "bridge wall" at the back of the Dutch oven helps contain the gas until it reaches full combustion. As the hot gas expands, it flows over the bridge wall. The bridge wall helps increase the velocity of this gas and forces it upward toward the boiler casing. The velocity of the gas decreases once it enters the space behind the bridge wall, allowing ash and soot to fall to the floor. The draft provided by the flue also helps draw the burning gases toward the boiler. If the draft is too strong, the gases move out of the furnace before fully combusting.

When Dutch ovens were first developed, they were constructed sitting in front of the boiler so as to create the largest combustion and mixing space. This design not only took up a good deal more floor space but also caused volatile matter to boil out of the fuel far too quickly.

== Evolution ==
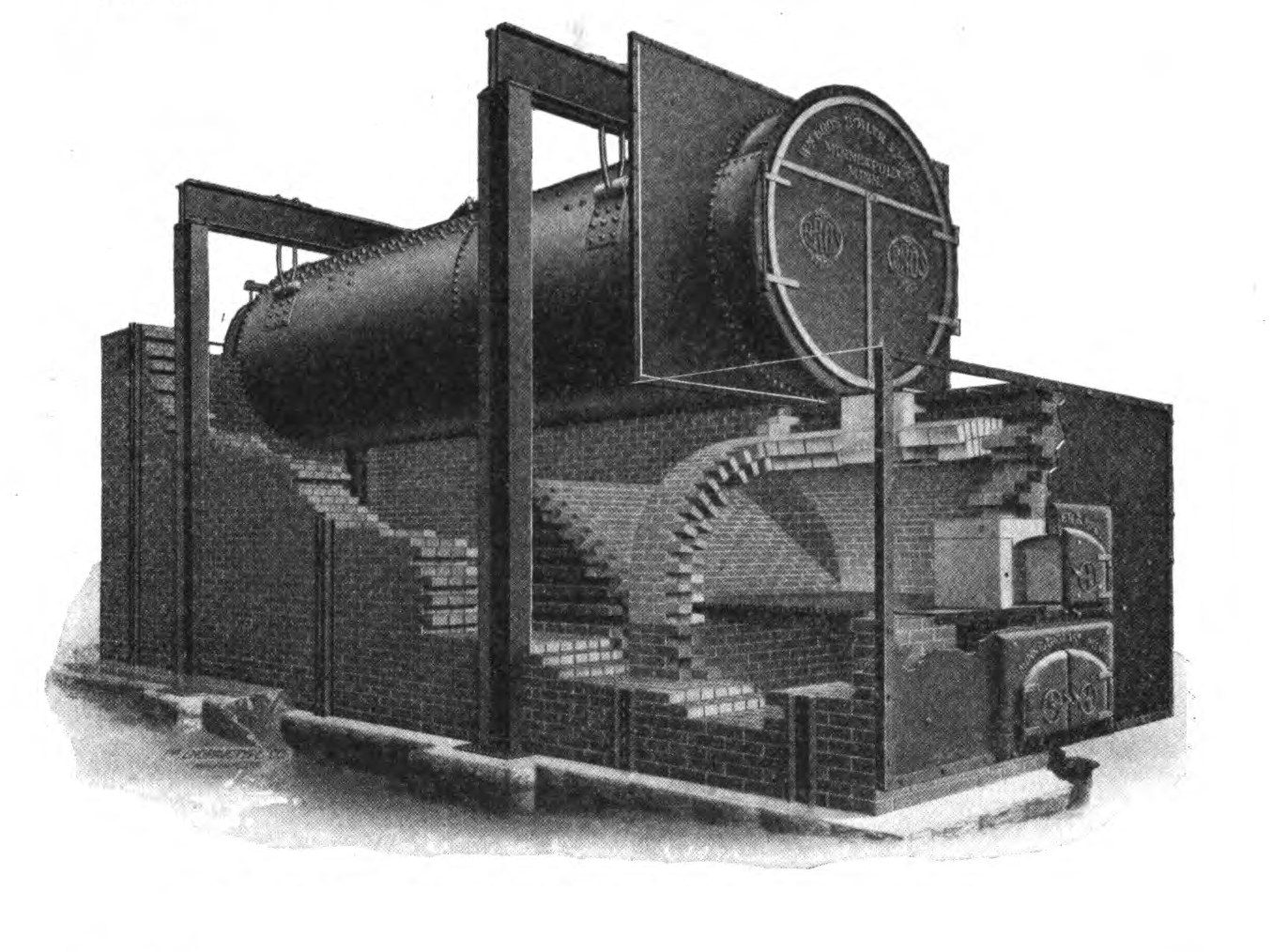
Cutaway drawing of a water-tube boiler, with the Dutch oven extension depicted at lower right. Fuel is shoveled in via the top door, while ash may be removed via the bottom door. Note the slanting bridge wall just behind the arch.

The Dutch oven began to be used in boilers about 1850.

As Dutch ovens evolved, steam was diverted from the boiler to help reduce the heat (to avoid too-rapid expansion of the mix before it combusted) and mix the air and volatile matter, but this only provided a minimal improvement. Moving the oven so that it was partly or completely under the boiler was then tried, but this tended to reduce the exposure of the boiler tubes to the burning gases. Dutch ovens completely under the boiler often employed a deflection arch to give the heavier volatile gases time to heat and combust before reaching the cooler boiler.

The final form of the Dutch oven was an extension partly beneath the boiler, with part of the oven roof removed. Even a partly extended Dutch oven creates wasteful heat radiation, but this is more than compensated by the higher levels of combustion.

Dutch ovens never provided a completely smokeless or full-combustion environment, and generally needed a boilerman or mechanical stoker to function well. They also take time to adjust to varying load levels of fuel, and changes in the nature of the fuel (e.g., higher or lower moisture content, different kinds of fuel).

Ash buildup inside the Dutch oven is normal, and the oven must be shut down or a low level of fuel loaded in order for the oven to be accessed and the ash removed. They also require regular maintenance, repair, and replacement of the refractory brick.

Dutch ovens are one of the modern combustion methods used for burning of wood and biomass on a large scale. Others including the traveling or varying grate, fluidized bed, and gasification. Modern commercial boilers, however, often no longer need them, as methods such as the inclined grate, spreader-stoker, suspension burning, and use of supplemental firing have superseded them. As of 2017, they were still widely used in the forestry and sugar industries.

The fuel cell burner, which uses a water-cooled grate and is automated, is a modern version of the Dutch oven.

== Bibliography ==
- Butterfield, Thomas E. (1929). Steam and Gas Engineering: A Text Covering Power Generating Apparatus Utilizing Energy Released by the Combustion of Fuels. London: Macmillan and Co. OCLC 156731454.
- Desideri, Umberto; Fantozzi, Francesco (2017). "Biomass Combustion and Chemical Looping for Carbon Capture and Storage". In Dahlquist, Erik (ed.). Technologies for Converting Biomass to Useful Energy Combustion, Gasification, Pyrolysis, Torrefaction and Fermentation. New York: CRC Press. ISBN 9781138077768.
- Dryden, I.G.C., ed. (1982). The Efficient Use of Energy. London: Butterworth Scientific. ISBN 9780408012508.
- Gebhardt, G.F. (1925). Steam Power Plant Engineering. New York: John Wiley & Sons. OCLC 1417550554.
- Hays, Joseph Weller (1906). Combustion and Smokeless Furnaces. New York: Hill Publishing Company. OCLC 3701569.
- Howard, James O. (1979). Wood for Energy in the Pacific Northwest: An Overview. Portland, Ore.: Pacific Northwest Forest and Range Experiment Station, U.S. Forest Service. OCLC 1225797774.
- Misostow, Henry (July 29, 1920). "At What Height Above the Grate Should a Return Tubular Boiler Be Set?". Coal Age. pp. 233–325.
- "Questions and Answers". The International Steam Engineer. February 1924. pp. 96–97.
- Petchers, Neil (2012). Combined Heating, Cooling & Power Handbook: Technologies & Applications. New York: Routledge. ISBN 9788770229135.
- Shealy, E.M. (1912). Steam Boilers. New York: McGraw-Hill. OCLC 1113580523.
