= SS James Carruthers =

Canadian Great Lakes freighter built in 1913

Coordinates: 43°32′07.0″N 82°20′39.1″W

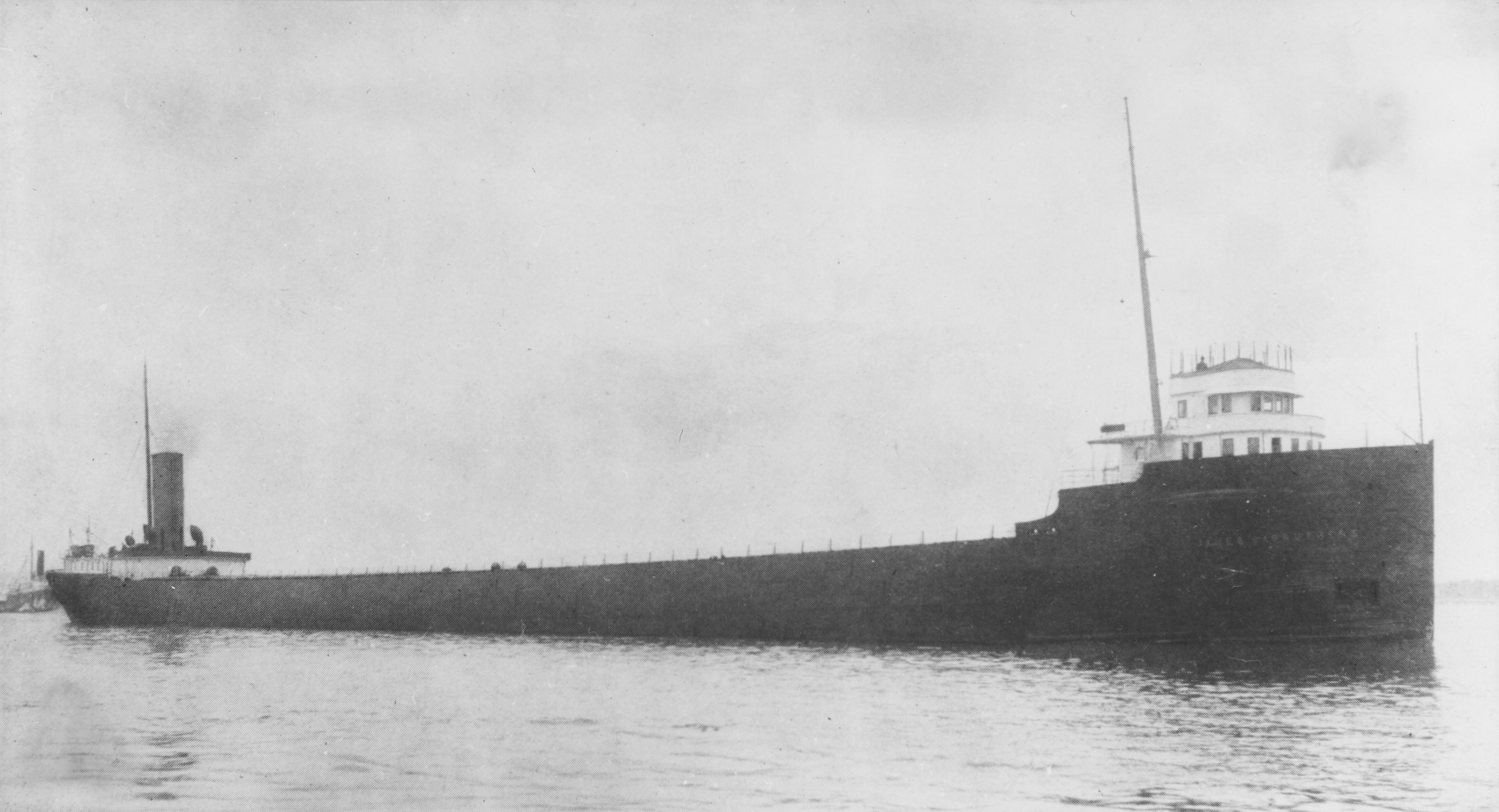
- James C. Carruthers

History

Canada
- Name: James C. Carruthers
- Operator: St. Lawrence & Chicago Steam Navigation Company Limited; Toronto, Ontario Canada
- Builder: Collingwood Shipbuilding Company; Collingwood, Ontario Canada
- Yard number: 0038
- Launched: 22 May 1913
- Completed: 1913
- Fate: Foundered 9 November 1913
- Notes: Canadian Registry #131090

General characteristics
- Class & type: Bulk freighter
- Tonnage: 7,862 GRT; 5,606 NRT
- Length: 550 ft (170 m)
- Beam: 58 ft (18 m)
- Depth: 27 ft (8.2 m)
- Propulsion: Triple expansion steam
- Crew: 22
- Notes: James Carruthers had a sister ship, SS J.H.G. Hagarty

SS James Carruthers was a Canadian Great Lakes freighter built in 1913. The ship was owned by the St. Lawrence & Chicago Steam Navigation Company Ltd., of Toronto, Ontario, with the official registry number 131090. The James Carruthers was lost 9 November 1913 on Lake Huron during the Great Lakes Storm of 1913. The crew of 22 perished with the vessel.

== Construction ==
The James Carruthers was built at Collingwood, Ontario by the Collingwood Shipbuilding Company; her yard number was 00038. She was a steel-hulled, propeller-driven lake freighter; 550 feet (170 m) in length, 58 feet (18 m) wide and 27 feet (8.2 m) deep. The gross register tonnage was 7,862 and the net register tonnage, 5,606.

== Final voyage ==
On the evening of November 6, 1913, the James Carruthers loaded a total of 375,000 bushels of wheat at Fort William, Ontario. Her destination was Ogilvie Milling in Port Colborne, Ontario, on the shores of Lake Erie. Captain William H. Wright had conferred with another downbound skipper, S.A. Lyons of the SS J.H. Sheadle, and planned to travel down Lake Superior together. Wright commented on his new boat, "We've still to learn all her tricks, and some of the lads in the fo'c'sle are complaining that the paint in their rooms is still a little sticky."

By 3 o'clock on the morning of November 8, the first hints of the storm blew over Lake Superior. The winds quickly shifted from southwest to northwest, bringing with them freezing temperatures, snow squalls, and high waves. The James Carruthers and the J.H. Sheadle were better than halfway to the Soo when the storm hit. By the evening, both vessels were locking through and snaking their way down the St. Mary's River. While going down the river the Canadian freighter passed the upbound Midland Prince. At 12:53 on the morning of November 9, the James Carruthers was sighted taking on coal at the Pickands, Mather & Company dock near De Tour, Michigan. Shortly after refueling, the James Carruthers entered Lake Huron, with the J.H. Sheadle a short distance behind. The lights of the James Carruthers were visible for a short time aboard the J.H. Sheadle as they sailed on a southeastern heading. A little after dawn, the James Carruthers disappeared into the horizon.

== Aftermath ==
After the great storm finally blew itself out late on November 10, copious amounts of wreckage from several boats began to wash onto Lake Huron's shores. Evidence of the James Carruthers was slow at first, until great amounts of debris from Canada's newest and largest freighter began coming ashore, mostly near Kincardine and Point Clark. A large field of wreckage was found offshore between Kincardine and Goderich, nearly 70 miles (110 km) south of the James Carruthers's known course. Several bodies of the crew washed ashore as well, mostly around Point Clark. Captain Wright was identified by his large red mustache. Most of the bodies wore life jackets and heavy coats, indicating that they did have time to prepare for disaster. During the height of the storm late on the afternoon of November 9, several witnesses heard steamer whistles and sighted distress rockets far offshore of Inverhuron. It was concluded that the rockets were from the James Carruthers as most of her wreckage and crew were found in the vicinity. How the brand-new freighter sank, and how she came to be so far off course remains a mystery.

The wreck of James Carruthers was located upside down on 26 May 2025, in 190 feet (57.9 m) of water, on the American side of Lake Huron, 20 miles east of Harbor Beach.
