= SS D. G. Kerr =

SS D. G. Kerr is the name of the following ships, named after David Garret Kerr:

- SS D. G. Kerr (1903)
- SS D. G. Kerr (1916)
