= SS William E. Corey =

20th-century bulk freighter

Coordinates: 43°33′N 79°35′W

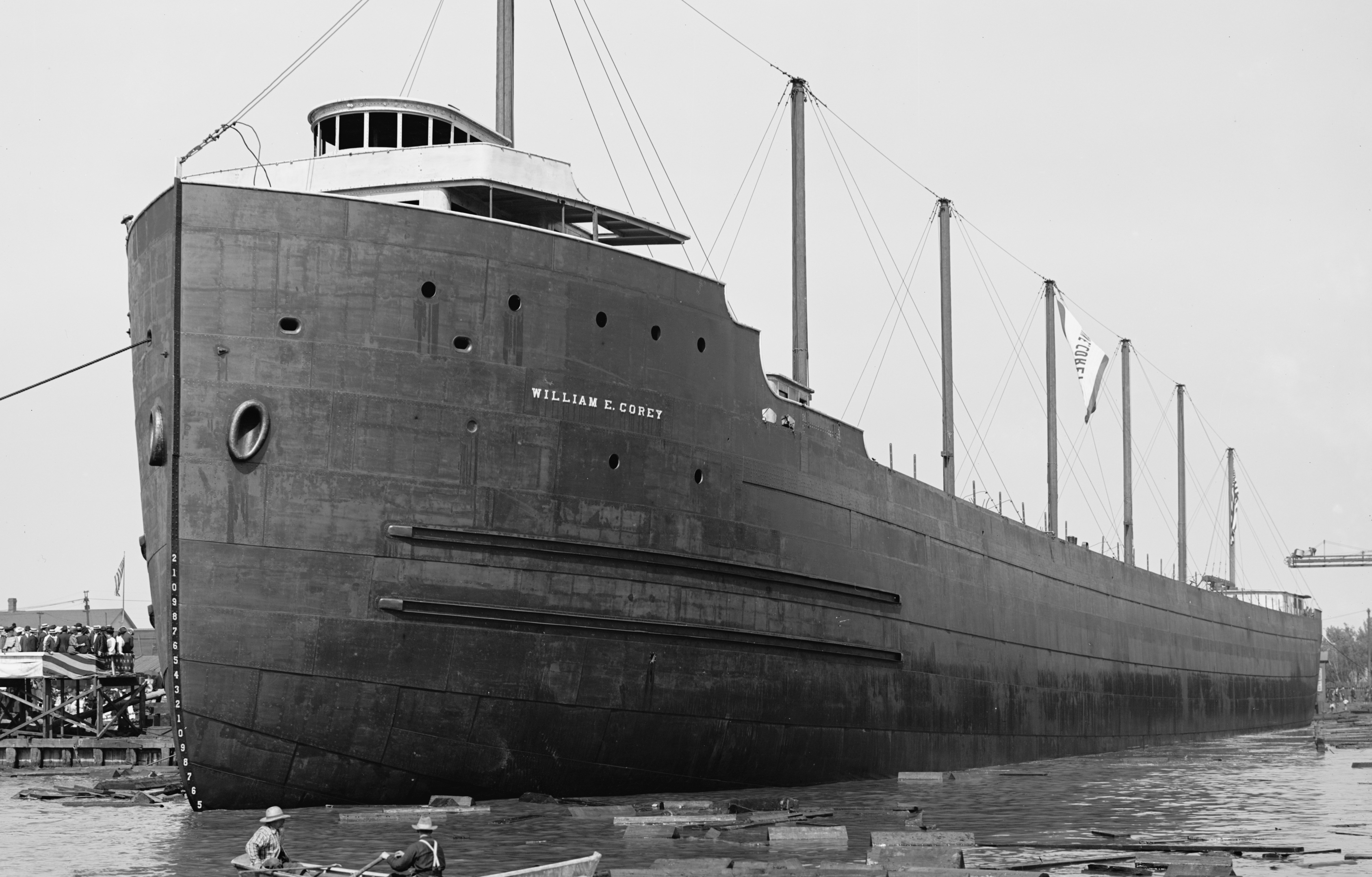
- The steamer William E. Corey after her launch

History
- Name: William E. Corey (1905–1963) (United States); Ridgetown (1963–1970) (Canada)
- Namesake: William Ellis Corey
- Operator: Pittsburgh Steamship Company (1905-1952); US Steel (1952-1963); Upper Lakes Shipping Ltd. (1963-1970)
- Port of registry: United States, Fairport, Michigan
- Builder: Chicago Shipbuilding Company
- Yard number: 67
- Launched: 24 June 1905
- Completed: 28 July 1905
- In service: 12 August 1905
- Out of service: November 17, 1969
- Identification: U.S. Registry #202296
- Fate: Sunk as a breakwater outside Mississauga, Ontario

General characteristics
- Type: Bulk freighter
- Tonnage: 6,363 GRT; 5,045 NRT
- Length: 569 ft (173 m)
- Beam: 56 ft (17 m)
- Height: 31 ft (9.4 m)
- Installed power: 2× Scotch marine boilers
- Propulsion: 1,800 horsepower (1,300 kW) triple expansion steam engine attached to a single fixed pitch propeller
- Speed: 10 knots
- Crew: 29

SS William E. Corey is a steel-hulled propeller-driven Great Lakes freighter that had a lengthy career on the Great Lakes. She served from her launching in 1905 to her conversion to a breakwater in 1970.

== History ==
William E. Corey was a product of the Chicago Shipbuilding Company of Chicago, Illinois. William E. Corey was launched on June 24, 1905, as hull number #67. The laker was one of four almost identical vessels; Elbert H. Gary and William E. Corey were both launched in Chicago, Henry C. Frick launched in West Bay City, Michigan and George W. Perkins launched in Superior, Wisconsin. All four vessels were the largest on the lakes at the time of their launch, hence the unofficial title "Queen of the Lakes".

== Mataafa Storm ==
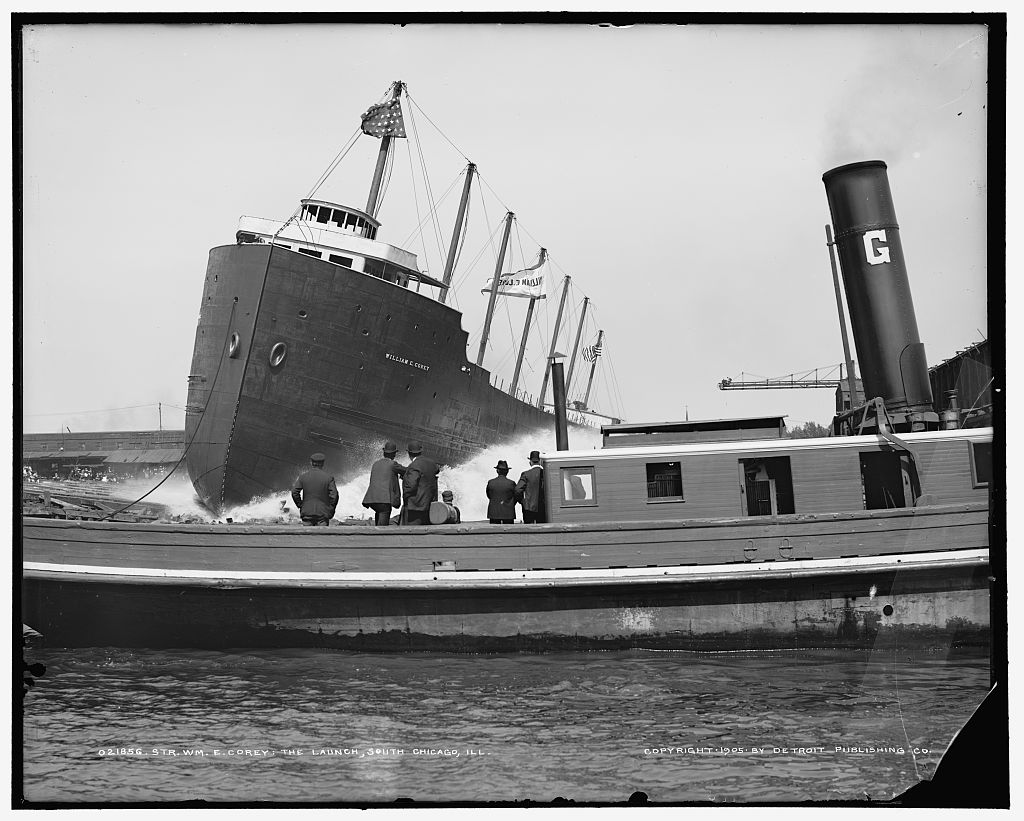
The launch of William E. Corey

Shortly after her launch the brand new William E. Corey encountered one of the worst storms in Great Lakes history, the Mataafa Storm of 1905. On November 28, William E. Corey was driven hard aground onto Gull Island Reef in the Apostle Islands. During a very short period of time the temperatures dropped to −12 °F (−24 °C) and the winds reached hurricane force. After the storm William E. Corey was refloated on December 10, 1905.

== SS Ridgetown ==
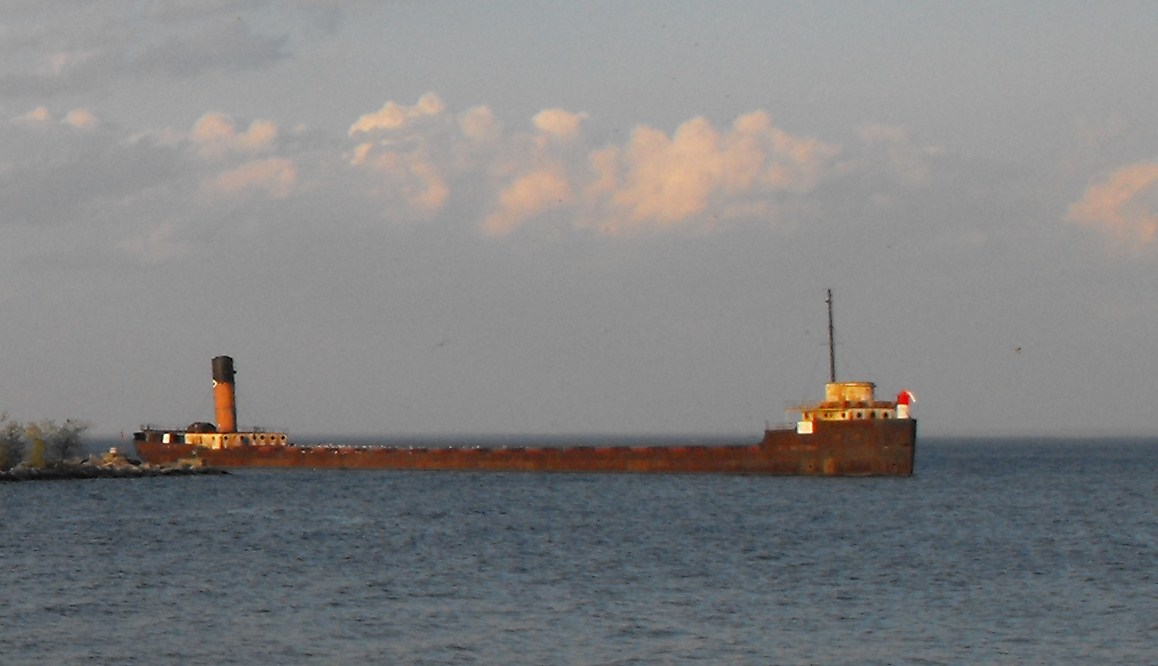
Ridgetown acted as the breakwater for the harbour.

Over the next fifty three years William E. Corey changed hands many times until in 1963 she was sold to the Upper Lakes Shipping Company and renamed Ridgetown. The ship served for seven more years until in May 1970 when she was scuttled as a temporary breakwater at Nanticoke, Ontario in the summer. It was later refloated in 1973. On June 21, 1974 she was scuttled as a breakwater at Mississauga, Ontario.
