= James Schoonmaker =

James Schoonmaker may refer to:

- James Martinus Schoonmaker (1842–1927), colonel during the American Civil War
- JC Schoonmaker (born 2000), American skier
- Ding Schoonmaker (born 1933), American sailor
- SS Col. James M. Schoonmaker, freighter on the Great Lakes
