= Queen of the Lakes =

Title given to the largest active vessel on the Great Lakes of North America

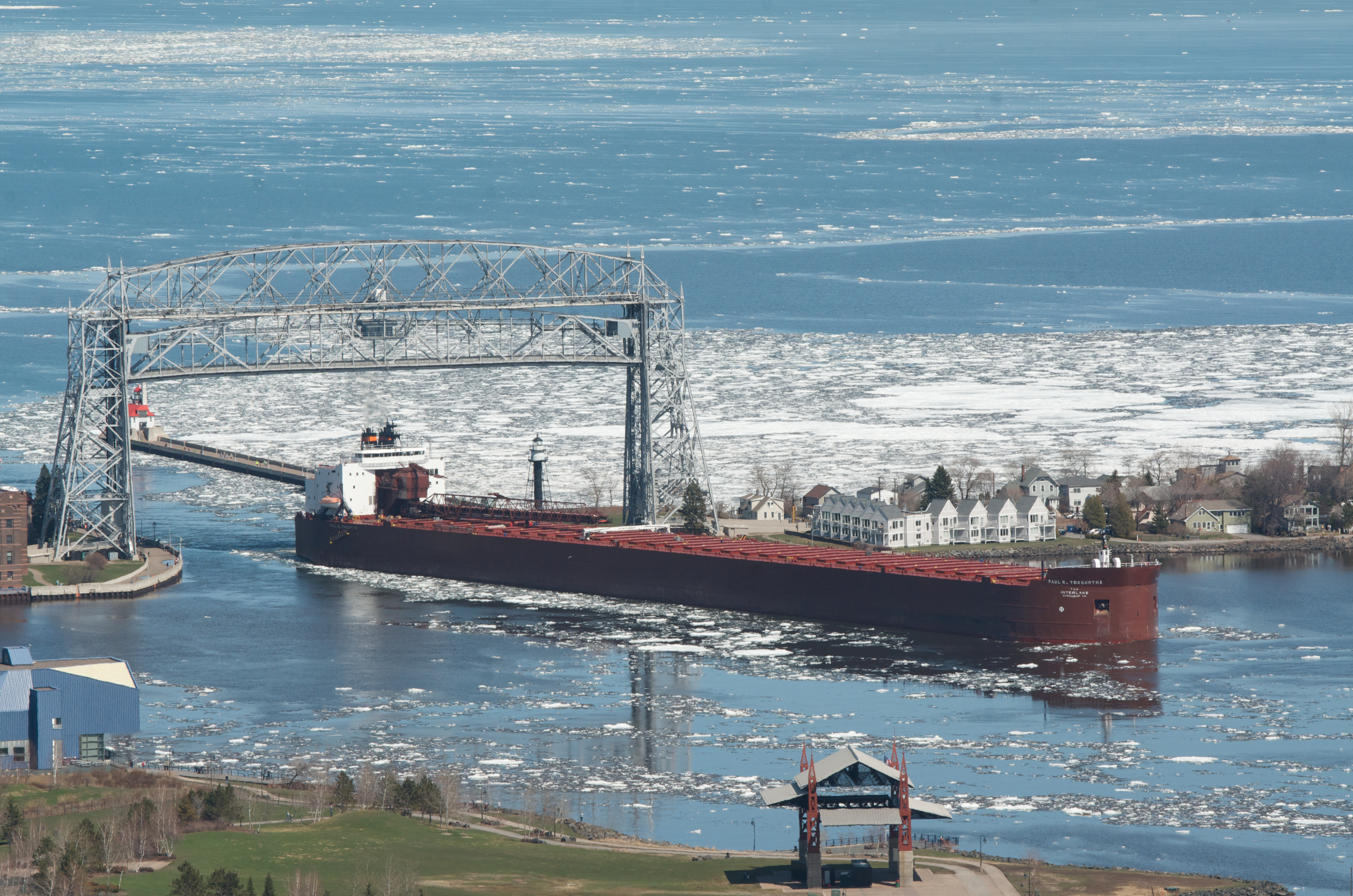
MV Paul R. Tregurtha, holder of the title Queen of the Lakes since 1981

Queen of the Lakes is an unofficial but widely recognized title bestowed upon vessels on the Great Lakes of the United States and Canada, honoring the longest vessel currently in service on the lakes. A number of vessels, mostly lake freighters, have been known by the title. Since 1981, the title has been held by MV Paul R. Tregurtha, a lake freighter of the 1000-foot category operated by the Interlake Steamship Company. MV Paul R. Tregurtha is 1,013.5 ft (308.9 m) long, and is the longest-running holder of the title.

== History of name ==
Queen of the Lakes has been used as the name of three vessels that sailed on the Great Lakes, but none was the longest on the lakes at the time. The first was a three-masted Canadian schooner built in 1853 as Robert Taylor, measuring 133 feet (41 m). It was renamed Queen of the Lakes sometime before 1864. She sank nine miles (14 km) off Sodus Point, New York on November 28, 1906. The second was a propeller-driven vessel launched in Cleveland, Ohio, on May 12, 1853, measuring 196 feet (60 m). She was lost to fire in port on June 17, 1869. The third was a small side-wheel steamer built in Wyandotte, Michigan in 1872, measuring 108 feet (33 m). While anchored near South Manitou Island she caught fire and burned in 1898. The iron hull was later scrapped.

The title has also been bestowed upon vessels that were especially liked or those considered to be especially beautiful or richly appointed. Such was the case as late as 1949, at which time Noronic was so honored. It has been applied to the United States Coast Guard cutter Mackinaw for its long and significant role in facilitating Great Lakes shipping and safety. The most common use of the title, however, at least since the early 1940s, is to honor the largest vessel on the lakes. On April 20, 1841, the Detroit Free Press referred to the steamer Illinois as "Queen of the Waters", but given that three vessels in that century were named Queen of the Lakes, its use as a title for the longest ship was not then common. The title is applied retroactively to vessels launched before this use of the title became popular. While some use gross tonnage, capacity, or length between perpendiculars as the criterion, the most commonly accepted standard is length overall (LOA). This article uses LOA as the standard.

== Early Queens ==
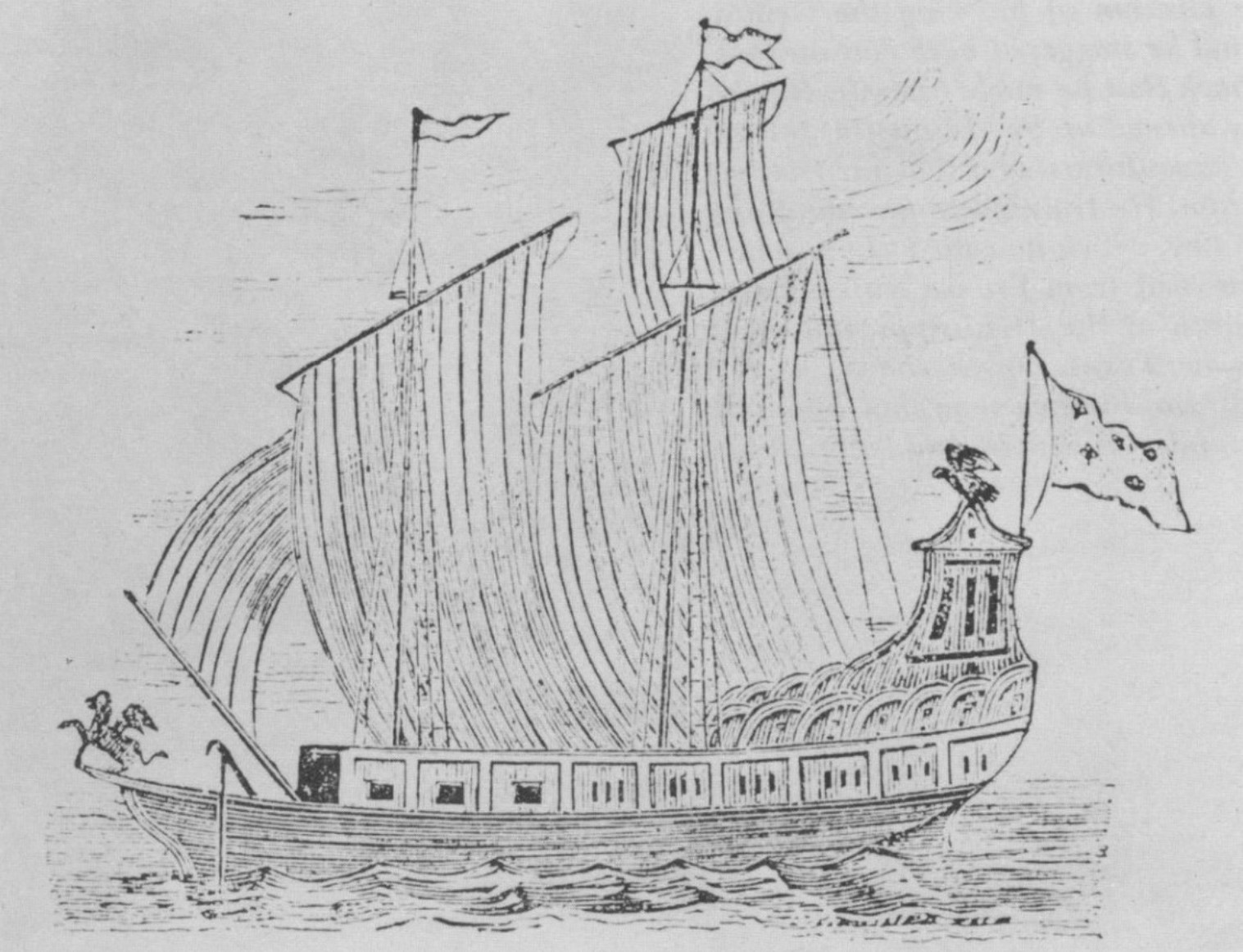
Le Griffon, first full-size sailing ship on the Great Lakes, 1679

The earliest vessels on the Great Lakes were human powered canoes and bateaux. Sources differ as to what vessel qualifies as the first real "ship" on the lakes. Many say it was Le Griffon, built by LaSalle through the winter and spring of 1678 and 1679, and launched in May of that year to sail the upper lakes (above Niagara). Reports of its size vary from 40 to 70 feet (12 to 21 m) long. Contemporary chroniclers called it both a bark and a brigantine. Le Griffon was soon lost. It was last seen on September 18, 1679 and was lost with all hands. Her final location is unknown. Those who consider Le Griffon to have been the first ship on the lakes—and hence, the first Queen—also consider her to have been the first lost.

Other sources say the first ship was a smaller vessel built by LaSalle at Fort Frontenac beginning in September 1678, for the purpose of conveying supplies and material to Niagara. This vessel, which is called Frontenac in some reports, is said to have been about 10 tons burthen, measuring from 35 to 45 feet (11 to 14 m) long. Expedition journalists called it a brigantine. It departed Fort Frontenac under La Motte's and Louis Hennepin's leadership on November 18, 1678, and arrived at the east bank of the Niagara River on December 6, 1679. Shortly thereafter, LaSalle and Tonty came with more supplies, and their vessel (carrying the anchor, rigging, and guns for Le Griffon) foundered in the surf less than thirty miles (48 km) from Niagara. Hennepin called this vessel a "great bark." One source says the loss occurred on January 8, 1679. Supplies and extra clothing were lost, but LaSalle and his men rescued material for the ship, dragged them to the mouth of the Niagara, rested a few days in an Indian village, and arrived at the settlement above the falls on January 20. Some say the lost vessel was Frontenac. Historian Francis Parkman says that by 1677, there were already four vessels on Lake Ontario between 25 and 40 tons burthen. He does not say if any of them were named. Tonty's journal indicates that the vessel he and LaSalle used was a 40-ton vessel, but he does not associate a name with it.

Records of ship sizes on the lakes between 1678 and 1816 are rare. According to the Detroit Tribune, the vessels Gladwin, Lady Charlotte, Victory, and Boston were on the lakes in 1766 and Brunswick, Enterprise, and Charity were launched in 1767, 1769, and 1770, respectively, but no dimensions are given. HMS Ontario, at 80 feet (24 m), was launched on Lake Ontario on May 10, 1780, and sank in a storm on October 31, that same year. A history of Washington Island in Door County, Wisconsin notes that the schooner Washington, used to supply the fitting out of Fort Howard at the head of Green Bay in 1816, was the longest ship on the lakes at the time, but no details are given.

== A succession of Queens ==
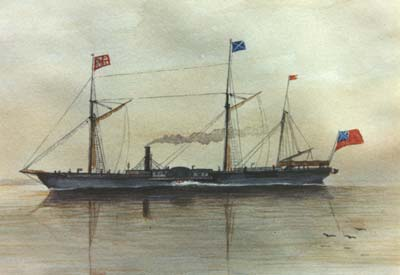
Frontenac, Queen of the Lakes from 1816 to 1827

On September 7, 1816, the steamer Frontenac was launched. She was fitted out as both a schooner and a side-wheel steamer and designed for both passenger and freight transport. At 170 feet (52 m) she laid claim to the honor of longest active vessel (Note: USS Superior and HMS St Lawrence were still afloat, but were inactive.) on the lakes, though she saw service only on Lake Ontario. She was scrapped at Niagara in 1827, and the next verifiable Queen was not launched until 1830.

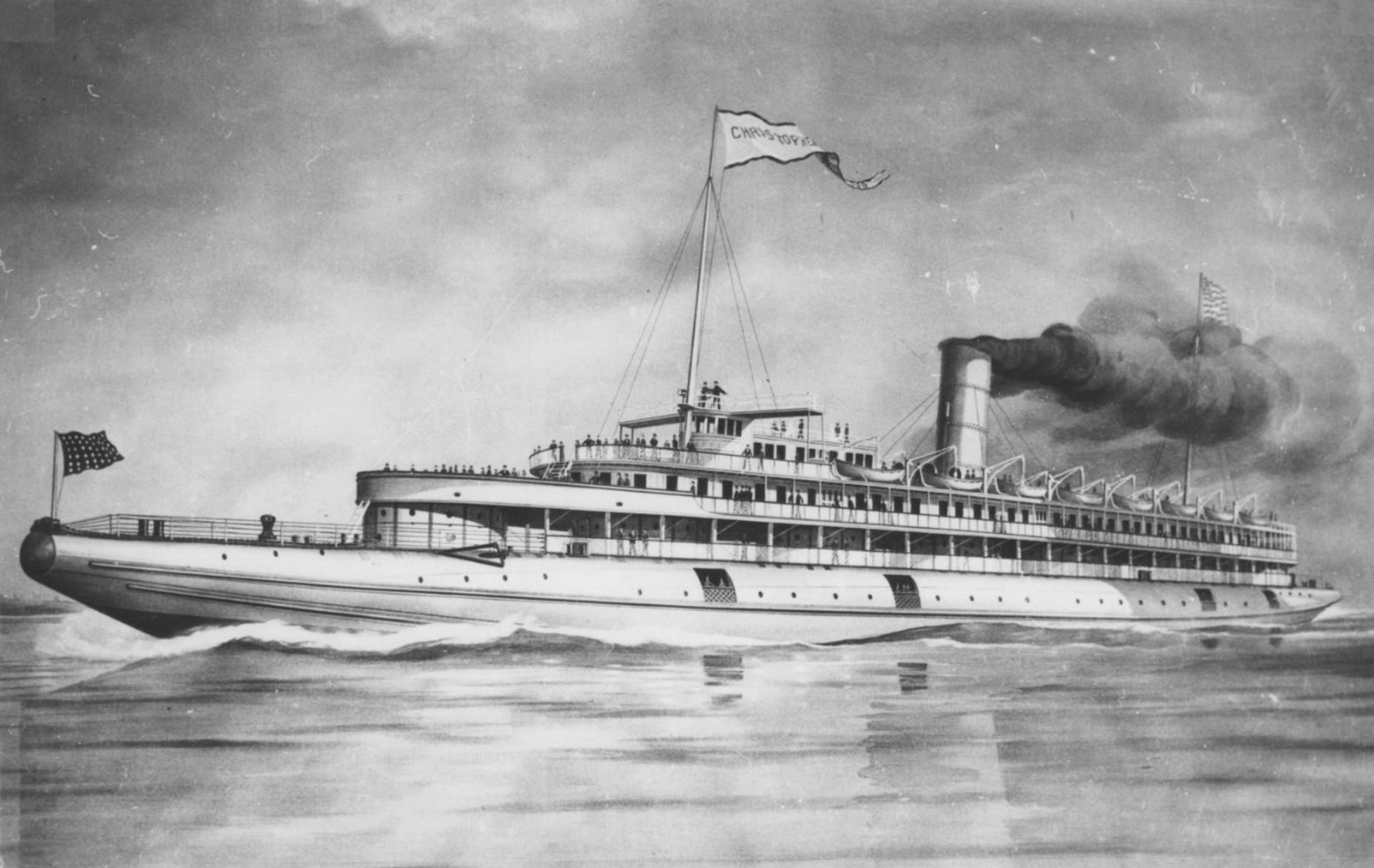
SS Christopher Columbus, Queen of the Lakes from 1892 to 1893

The chart below identifies the succession of vessels known to qualify as Queen of the Lakes from 1813 to the present. The succession of queens is not known to be continuous before David Dows. Those from Frontenac through City of Buffalo were side-wheel steamships, though Michigan, like Frontenac was dual fitted as an operational schooner. The heyday of the luxurious passenger steamers was waning even as some of them were launched. Mississippi, Plymouth Rock, and Western World were all out of service by 1859, and the Queens that had not already been lost by 1862 were rebuilt as barges or schooners or dismantled within a year. Nebraska was a propeller-driven steamer for freight and passenger use, but given what had happened to her predecessors, she was likely not so richly appointed. In 1904, Nebraska was refitted as a lumber carrier, after which time she resembled a classic bulk carrier. David Dows was a 5-masted schooner used primarily for transporting wheat. Susquehanna, Owego, and Chemung were propeller-driven package freighters. The whaleback Christopher Columbus was a celebrated passenger vessel. Onoko and all other vessels from Curry on were or are propeller-driven bulk carriers.

The steamship Quebec, launched in 1865, appears in lists of Great Lakes vessels. At 283 feet, she was longer than both Nebraska and David Dows, but her service was on the St. Lawrence River between Montreal and Quebec, not on the Great Lakes proper. She continued in service for many years and was dismantled in 1938.

Queen of the Lakes: 1813 to present
Ship	Reign begins	Reign ends	Length (ft)	Length (m)	Vessel type	Launched	Final disposition	Date	Notes
USS General Pike	June 12, 1813	May 2, 1814	145	44.2	Corvette	June 12, 1813	sold	1825	
USS Superior	May 2, 1814	September 10, 1814	unknown (Note: Available records indicate only her tonnage. At 1,605 tons she was 80% larger than USS General Pike. Her length, therefore, could have been about 180 feet. At her launch she was the largest ship in the U.S. Navy)	unknown	Frigate	May 2, 1814	sold	1824	not active after the war (Note: Two other U.S. Naval vessels, USS New Orleans and USS Chippewa, were under construction at Sackett's Harbor, New York in 1815. At 204 feet and 2,805 tons they might have shared the title, but they were not finished before the end of the war and were never launched. They were sold for scrap in 1833.)
HMS St Lawrence	September 10, 1814	undetermined (Note: Not active after the war)	194 2	59.2 (Note: This is the length of her gun deck. LOA was slightly more. At 2,305 tons she was not as large as the American vessels planned and under construction the following year.)	First-rate ship (Note: She was the only first-rate ship-of-the-line built by the British Navy for fresh water seas.)	September 10, 1814	sold (Note: See further details at HMS St Lawrence)	1832	British
Washington	undetermined	1816	unknown	unknown	Sloop	unknown	unknown	unknown	Name of Washington Island traced to this ship
Frontenac	September 7, 1816	undetermined	170	51.8	Side-wheel steamer/schooner	September 7, 1816	scrapped, Niagara, New York	1827	First steamboat on the lakes; Canadian
Great Britain	October 16, 1830	undetermined	147 or 160	44.8 or 48.8 (Note: The files at BGSU say she was 147 feet. The report in say she was 160 feet. Contemporary length figures sometimes refer to keel length, sometimes to deck length, sometimes to length overall. If the Kingston Chronicle figure is correct, Great Britain eclipses Michigan. The hull of Great Britain was converted to a barque in early 1845, and renamed Eleanora. The final disposition of Eleanora is not known. Links accessed March 12, 2011)	Side-wheel steamer	October 16, 1830	converted to barque	1845	Canadian
George Washington	September 1, 1833	October 9, 1833	180	54.9	Side-wheel steamer	September 1, 1833	aground and broke, Long Point, Lake Erie	October 9, 1833	sank on third trip
Michigan	October 9, 1833	undetermined	156	47.5	Side-wheel steamer/schooner	September 30, 1833	dismantled	1855	First to have passenger deck above main deck
James Madison (Note: Thompson says that Great Western was the largest for a time, as do a number of contemporary reports. Built in 1839, at 183 feet, Great Western was the first ship with a second passenger deck. A search of transcripts of contemporary newspaper articles at indicates that three other vessels were longer, even though Great Western with a wider beam had greater capacity. The Great Lakes paddle steamer Great Western is not to be confused with the oceangoing SS Great Western.)	December 13, 1836	August 2, 1837	181	55.2	Side-wheel steamer	December 13, 1836			
Buffalo	August 2, 1837	September 23, 1837	194	59.1	Side-wheel steamer	August 2, 1837			
Illinois	September 23, 1837	undetermined	205	62.5	Side-wheel steamer	September 23, 1837	dismantled	1849	
Empire	June 5, 1844	1848	265	80.8	Side-wheel steamer	June 5, 1844	grounded and broke apart	November 16, 1870	World's largest steamboat
Atlantic	1848	1849	267	81.4	Side-wheel steamer	1848	Sank after collision	August 19, 1852	
Mayflower	1849	1853	285	86.9	Side-wheel steamer	1849	grounded in fog	November 29, 1854	
Mississippi	1853	1854	326.66	99.6	Side-wheel steamer	1853	dismantled	1862	
Plymouth Rock	March 21, 1854	April 18, 1854	335.5	102.3	Side-wheel steamer	March 21, 1854	dismantled	May 1863	
Western World	April 18, 1854	1863	337	102.7	Side-wheel steamer	April 18, 1854	converted to dry dock	1863	Largest in world at launch
City of Buffalo (Note: Not to be confused with a later side-wheel steamer of the same name.)	April 11, 1857	July 30, 1866	340	103.6 (Note: Contemporary reports list 330, 340, and 350 feet.)	Side-wheel steamer (Note: Dismantled in 1862 her hull was converted into a propeller freighter April 11, 1864.)	April 11, 1857	burned; Buffalo, New York	July 30, 1866	
(reverts to Empire ?)		undetermined	265	80.8	rebuilt as sloop/barge 1862				
Nebraska	1867	undetermined	267.33	81.5	Propeller steamer	1867	burned at South Manitou	October 4, 1904	rebuilt August 1904 as lumber carrier
David Dows	April 21, 1881	February 16, 1882	278	84.7	5-masted schooner	April 21, 1881	sank in 35 ft (11 m) of water	November 29, 1899	
Onoko	February 16, 1882	November 6, 1884	302	92.0	Bulk carrier	February 16, 1882	sank	August 14, 1915	First iron Queen
SS Lansdowne	November 6, 1884	August 4, 1886	312	95.1	Sidewheel rail ferry	November 6, 1886	scrapped	April 2009	Iron hulled rail ferry
Susquehanna	August 4, 1886	July 7, 1887	326 6	99.5	Package freighter	August 4, 1886	scrapped	1926	
Owego	July 7, 1887	December 3, 1892	350 7	106.9	Package freighter	July 7, 1887	sank in China	1944	
Chemung	February 29, 1888	(shared)	350 7	106.9	Package freighter	February 29, 1888	torpedoed in the Mediterranean Sea	November 26, 1916	
Christopher Columbus	December 3, 1892	April 29, 1893	362	110.3	Whaleback passenger	December 3, 1892	scrapped, Manitowoc, Wisconsin	1936	
Curry	April 29, 1893	June 29, 1895	377 6	115.1	Bulk carrier	April 29, 1893	scrapped, Fairport, Ontario	1937	
Merida	May 1, 1893	(shared)	377 6	115.1	Bulk carrier	May 1, 1893	sank in storm	October 20, 1916	
Centurion	August 30, 1893	(shared)	377 6	115.1	bulk carrier	August 30, 1893	scrapped, Hamilton, Ontario	1947	
Victory	June 29, 1895	December 23, 1895	398	121.3	Bulk carrier	June 29, 1895	sunk as breakwater	July 21, 1969	
Zenith City	August 16, 1895	(shared)	398	121.3	Bulk carrier	August 16, 1895	scrapped, Hamilton, Ontario	1947	
W. D. Rees	December 23, 1895	February 22, 1896	413	125.9	Bulk carrier	December 23, 1895	scrapped, Lackawanna, New York	1955	
Coralia	February 22, 1896	August 1, 1896	432	131.7	Bulk carrier	February 22, 1896	scrapped, Hamilton, Ontario	1964	
Sir Henry Bessemer	May 5, 1896	(shared)	432	131.7	Bulk carrier	May 5, 1896	scrapped, Sturgeon Bay, Wisconsin	1971	
Sir William Siemens	July 25, 1896	(shared)	432	131.7	Bulk carrier	July 25, 1896	sank in collision	April 27, 1944	
Sir William Fairbairn	August 1, 1896	April 13, 1898	445	135.6	Bulk carrier	August 1, 1896	scrapped		
Robert Fulton	September 10, 1896	(shared)	445	135.6	bulk carrier	September 10, 1896	scrapped, Hamilton, Ontario	1948	
Superior City	April 13, 1898	July 31, 1898	450	137.2	Bulk carrier	April 13, 1898	sank in collision	August 20, 1920	
Samuel F.B. Morse	July 31, 1898	January 20, 1900	475	144.8	Bulk carrier	July 31, 1898	scrapped, Sturgeon Bay, Wisconsin	1975	
Douglas Houghton	June 3, 1899	(shared)	475	144.8	Bulk carrier	June 3, 1898	sunk as breakwater, Toronto	1969	
John W. Gates	January 20, 1900	April 9, 1904	497	151.5	Bulk carrier	January 20, 1900	scrapped, Conneaut, Ontario	1961	
James J. Hill	January 24, 1900	(shared)	497	151.5	Bulk carrier	January 24, 1900	sunk as breakwater, Cleveland, Ohio	1961	
Isaac L. Ellwood	May 5, 1900	(shared)	497	151.5	Bulk carrier	May 5, 1900	scrapped, Conneaut, Ontario	1961	
William Edenborn	May 20, 1900	(shared)	497	151.5	Bulk carrier	May 20, 1900	sunk as breakwater, Cleveland, Ohio	1961	
Augustus B. Wolvin	April 9, 1904	May 8, 1905	560	170.7	Bulk carrier	April 9, 1904	scrapped, Santander, Spain	September 24, 1967	First to have telescoping steel hatch covers
Elbert H. Gary	May 8, 1905	May 26, 1906	569	173.4	Bulk carrier	May 8, 1905	scrapped, Santander, Spain	July 1973	
William E. Corey	June 24, 1905	(shared)	569	173.4	Bulk carrier	June 24, 1905	sunk as breakwater, Port Credit, Ontario	1970	
George W. Perkins	June 26, 1905	(shared)	569	173.4	Bulk carrier	June 26, 1905	scrapped, Ashtabula, Ohio	November 3, 1981	
Henry C. Frick	August 26, 1905	(shared)	569	173.4	Bulk carrier	August 26, 1905	sank on way to scrapper	November 15, 1972	
J. Pierpont Morgan	May 26, 1906	August 18, 1906	601	183.2	Bulk carrier	May 26, 1906	scrapped, Lauzon, Quebec	March 30, 1979	First "standard design"
Henry H. Rogers	June 16, 1906	(shared)	601	183.2	Bulk carrier	June 16, 1906	scrapped, Duluth, Minnesota	1975	
Norman B. Ream	August 18, 1906	(shared)	601	183.2	bulk carrier	August 18, 1906	scrapped, Turkey	1990	
Edward Y. Townsend	August 18, 1906	December 29, 1906	603	183.8	Bulk carrier	August 18, 1906	sank on way to scrapper	October 7, 1968	
William B. Kerr	December 29, 1906	May 1, 1909	605 9	184.6	bulk carrier	Dec. 29. 1906	scrapped, Santander, Spain	July 21, 1974	
Legrande S. DeGraff	May 1, 1907	(shared)	605 9	184.6	bulk carrier	May 1, 1907	scrapped	1975	
William M. Mills	July 17, 1907	(shared)	605 9	184.6	bulk carrier	July 17, 1907	scrapped	1976	
Shenango	May 1, 1909	July 1, 1911	606	184.7	bulk carrier	May 1, 1909	scrapped, Port Maitland, Ontario	November 1, 1984	
SS Col. James M. Schoonmaker	July 1, 1911	April 14, 1914	617	188.1	bulk carrier	July 1, 1911	later named SS Willis B. Boyer, now a museum ship as SS Col. James M. Schoonmaker in Toledo, Ohio	Out of service, 1980; Museum ship, 1987	Oldest Queen still afloat
William P. Snyder Jr.	January 27, 1912	(shared)	617	188.1	bulk carrier	January 27, 1912	scrapped, Port Colborne, Ont.	Jan. 1988	
W. Grant Morden	April 14, 1914	June 23, 1926	625	190.5	bulk carrier	April 14, 1914	scrapped, Bilbao, Spain	July 12, 1969	
Glenmohr/Lemoyne	June 23, 1926	April 9, 1927	634	193.2	bulk carrier	June 23, 1926	scrapped, Santander, Spain	June 1969	Third Canadian Queen
SS Carl D. Bradley	April 9, 1927	June 28, 1949	640	195.1	bulk carrier	April 9, 1927	sank in storm	November 18, 1958	Second longest reign
SS Wilfred Sykes	June 28, 1949	Nov. 1952	678	206.7	bulk carrier	June 28, 1949	still active	present	First streamlined design
Joseph H. Thompson	Nov. 1952	November 7, 1953	714 3	217.7	bulk carrier	1944	converted to barge 1991	present	Queen by lengthening
T.R. McLagan	November 7, 1953	1957	714 6	217.8	bulk carrier	November 7, 1953	scrapped, India	2004	renamed Oakglen
SS Cliffs Victory	1957	June 7, 1958	716 3	218.3	bulk carrier	1945	scrapped, Taiwan	1987	Queen by lengthening
SS Edmund Fitzgerald	June 7, 1958	September 17, 1959	729 3	222.3	bulk carrier	June 7, 1958	sank in storm	November 10, 1975	Largest ship to have sunk on the Lakes; Most well known Queen; most recent lake freighter to sink
Murray Bay	September 17, 1959	December 7, 1962	730	222.5	bulk carrier	September 17, 1958	renamed Comeaudoc	Out of service December 4, 1996; scrapped, Port Colborne, Canada 2002	First 730 ft vessel on the Lakes
SS Arthur B. Homer	November 7, 1959	(shared)	730	222.5	bulk carrier	November 7, 1959	scrapped, Port Colborne, Ontario	Out of service 4 October 1980; scrapped, Port Colborne, Ontario 1987	Sister ship of the SS Edmund Fitzgerald; largest ship to be scrapped on the Great Lakes
SS Edward L. Ryerson	January 26, 1960	(shared)	730	222.5	bulk carrier	January 26, 1960	Laid up, Superior, Wisconsin	Out of service, 2009	most streamlined
Whitefish Bay	November 16, 1960	(shared)	730	222.5	bulk carrier	November 16, 1960	Scrapped	Out of service 1990s	
Red Wing	1960	(shared)	730	222.5	bulk carrier	1960	scrapped	1986	
Leecliffe Hall	September 10, 1961	(shared)	730	222.5	bulk carrier	September 10, 1961	sank after collision	September 5, 1964	
Leon Falk, Jr.	1961	(shared)	730	222.5	bulk carrier	1945	scrapped, Spain	1985	Queen by lengthening
Paul H. Carnahan	1961	(shared)	730	222.5	bulk carrier	1945	scrapped, Taiwan	1987	Queen by lengthening
Pioneer Challenger	1961	(shared)	730	222.5	bulk carrier	1943	Renamed American Victory	Scrapped, Turkey, August 2018	
Lake Winnipeg	1961	(shared)	730	222.5	bulk carrier	November 28, 1943	scrapped, Lisbon, Portugal	May 1985	Queen by lengthening
SS Walter A. Sterling	1962	(shared)	730	222.5	bulk carrier	1942	Renamed MV Lee A. Tregurtha	present	Queen by lengthening
Montrealais	April 12, 1962	(shared)	730	222.5	bulk carrier	April 12, 1962	scrapped	2015	
Hamiltonian	April 7, 1962	(shared)	730	222.5	bulk carrier	April 7, 1962	scrapped, Alang, India	1997	
Black Bay	September 20, 1962	(shared)	730	222.5	bulk carrier	September 20, 1962	Scrapped, India	2002	
Baie St. Paul	November 30, 1962	(shared)	730	222.5	bulk carrier	November 30, 1962	scrapped, Taiwan	May 1995	
Frankcliffe Hall	December 7, 1962	April 14, 1965	730 2	222.6	bulk carrier	December 7, 1962	Renamed Halifax	Scrapped, Turkey, June 22, 2001	
Lawrencecliffe Hall	April 14, 1965	January 1, 1972	730 4	222.6	bulk carrier	April 14, 1965	Renamed Canadian Venture	Scrapped, India, 2004	
MV Stewart J. Cort	January 1, 1972	August 7, 1976	1,000	304.8	bulk carrier	January 1, 1972	still active	present	Last "classic" Queen
Presque Isle	1973	(shared)	1,000	304.8	bulk carrier	1973	still active	present	Integrated barge
MV James R. Barker	August 7, 1976	April 25, 1981	1,004	306.0	bulk carrier	August 7, 1976	still active	present	First stern-ender Queen
MV Mesabi Miner	February 14, 1978	(shared)	1,004	306.0	bulk carrier	February 14, 1978	still active	present	
George A. Stinson	July 15, 1978	(shared)	1,004	306.0	bulk carrier	July 15, 1978	Renamed American Spirit	present	
Edwin H. Gott	July 19, 1978	(shared)	1,004	306.0	bulk carrier	July 19, 1978	still active	present	
Edgar B. Speer	May 8, 1980	(shared)	1,004	306.0	bulk carrier	May 8, 1980	still active	present	
MV William J. Delancey	April 25, 1981	present	1,013 6	308.9	bulk carrier	April 25, 1981	Renamed MV Paul R. Tregurtha	present	Longest reigning queen
1. First with stanchion-less hold, side ballast tanks, and telescoping hatches

== Sources ==
- Thompson, Mark L. (1994). Queen of the Lakes. Detroit, Michigan: Wayne State University Press. ISBN 9780814343371.
- Historical Collections of the Great Lakes Bowling Green State University, Bowling Green, Ohio (BGSU) Accessed July 10, 2026
