= 600-footers =

The 600-footers were a class of lake freighters all built to the design of the J. Pierpont Morgan. The J. Pierpont Morgan was launched in April, 1906, and was, at the time, the longest vessel on the Great Lakes.

Her sister ships were not all identical. Minor modifications were made. Mark L. Thompson, author of Queen of the Lakes, wrote that between 56 and 76 vessels were built to this design.

The 600-footers could use harbours that larger 730 feet (220 m) seawaymax vessels can't use. Until 1961 no vessel longer than 600 feet was able to access Cleveland's harbour.

The vessels' draught was 19 feet (5.8 m). Their beam was 58 feet (18 m). They were powered by triple expansion steam engines, providing 1,800 shaft horsepower (1,300 kW), and could carry 11,000 tons of cargo. They cost $440,000 to construct, in 1906 dollars.

selected 600-footers
image	initial name	launched	retired	notes
	J. Pierpont Morgan	1906-04-18	1979	Was Queen of the Lakes, when launched.
	Henry H. Rogers	1906-06-16		Was approximately one foot longer than the J. Pierpont Morgan, making her, briefly, Queen of the Lakes.
	Norman R. Beam	1906-08-18	1990	ended her life as a permanently moored barge.
	Peter A.B. Widener	1906-10-20		
	Edward Y. Townsend	1906	1968	
	Daniel J. Morrell	1906	1966	Broke up in a storm on Lake Huron on 29 November 1966, 28 out of 29 crew lost.
	Henry Phipps	1907	1976	
	Col. James M. Schoonmaker	1911-07-01		modified to be 617 feet (188 m), Queen of the Lakes.
	D.G. Kerr	1916		
	D.M. Clemson	1917		
	Eugene W. Pargny	1917-01-20	1984	
	Homer D. Williams	1917		
	August Zeising	1917		
	William H Warner	1923		
