= SS Augustus B. Wolvin =

U.S. Great Lakes freighter

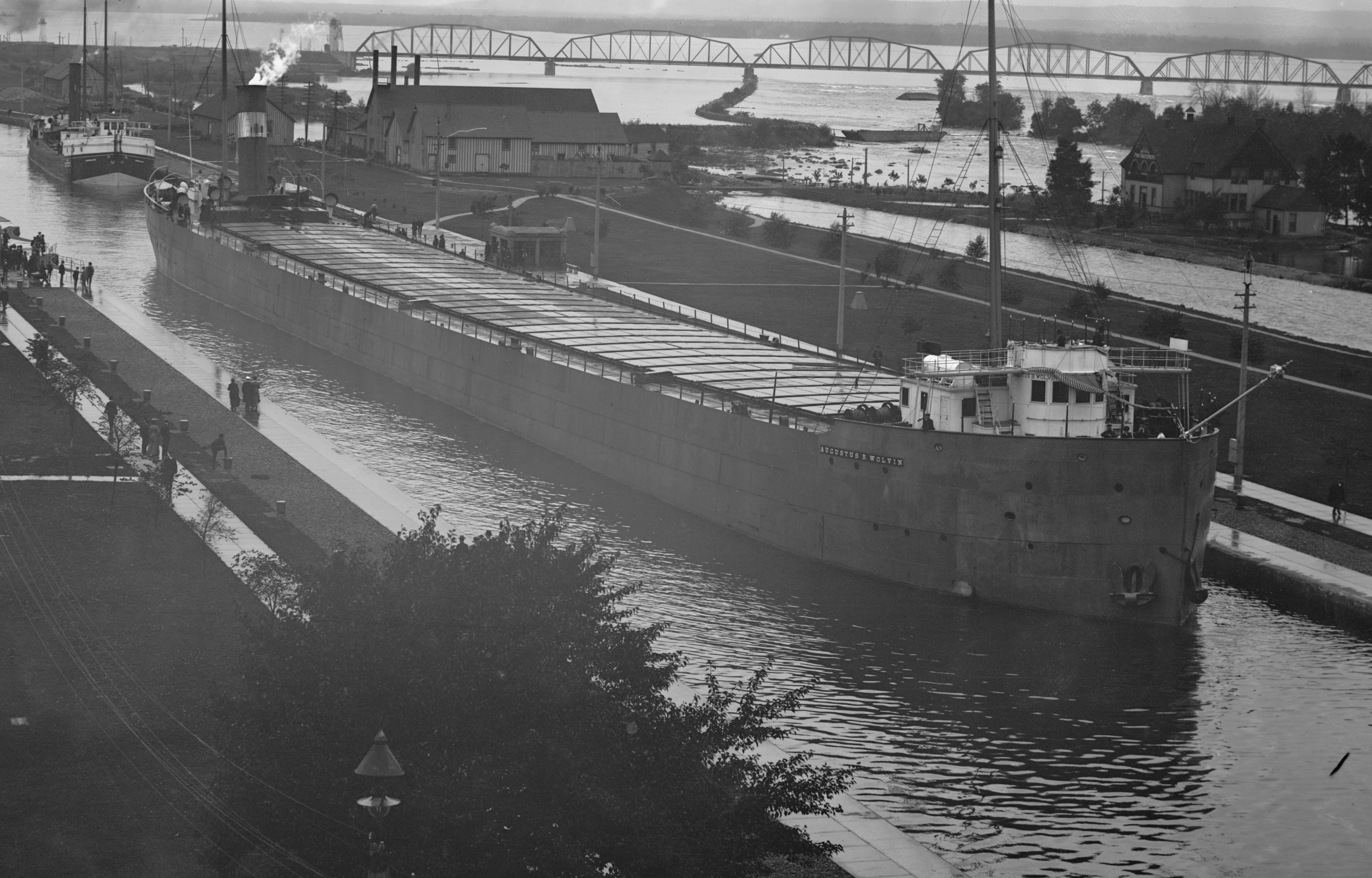
- Augustus B. Wolvin in Poe Lock

History

United States
- Name: Augustus B. Wolvin
- Namesake: Benjamin Wolvin
- Operator: Acme Steamship Company 1904–1913; Lackawanna Steamship Company 1904–1966; Labrador Steamship Company 1966–1967
- Port of registry: (United States) Duluth, Minnesota
- Builder: American Shipbuilding Company, Cleveland, Ohio
- Yard number: 330
- Launched: April 9, 1904
- In service: 1904
- Out of service: 1967
- Identification: U.S. Registry #200883
- Fate: Scrapped in 1967, in Santander, Spain
- Notes: Augustus B. Wolvin was the first vessel to have telescoping steel hatch covers

General characteristics
- Tonnage: 6,585 GRT; 5,311 NRT
- Length: 560 ft (170 m)
- Beam: 56 ft (17 m)
- Depth: 32 ft (9.8 m)
- Installed power: 2 x Scotch marine boilers
- Propulsion: 2,000 hp (1,500 kW) quadruple expansion steam engine

Augustus B. Wolvin was a 560 ft (170 m) long Great Lakes freighter that had a 63-year career on the Great Lakes. Augustus B. Wolvin was a product of the American Shipbuilding Company of Cleveland, Ohio. She was built for the Acme Steamship Company of Duluth, Minnesota.

She was launched as hull #330 on April 9, 1904. At the time of her launch her nickname was "Yellow Kid". She was powered by a quadruple expansion steam engine attached to a single fixed pitch propeller and fueled by two coal-fired scotch marine boilers. At the time of her launch Augustus B. Wolvin was the longest vessel operating on the Great Lakes (hence the unofficial title "Queen of the Lakes"), she was also the first vessel that had telescoping steel hatch covers which replaced the old wooden hatch covers.

She was also the first lake freighter built without vertical support beams in her holds. This innovation allowed for faster, more automated, loading and unloading.

In 1913 the fleet owned by Acme Steamship Company was sold to the Lackawanna Steamship Company of Cleveland, Ohio (managed by Pickands Mather & Company). The fleet was later purchased by Interlake Steamship Company. In 1946 Augustus B. Wolvin had her telescoping hatch covers replaced with new single piece steel hatch covers (the space between the hatch covers was 24 feet (7.3 m) feet) and a new hatch crane. This rebuild was done by the Great Lakes Engineering Works of Ecorse, Michigan. In 1966 the ship was sold to the Canadian Labrador Steamship Company of Montreal, Quebec.

== Scrapping ==
In June 1967 Augustus B. Wolvin ran aground in the Welland Canal and suffered severe bottom damage. Eventually she was declared a total loss at Port Weller and towed to Hamilton, Ontario. She was sold to the Marine Salvage Inc. of Port Colborne, Ontario. She was resold to a Spanish shipbreaker and towed down the St. Lawrence Seaway in August 1967. She arrived in Santander, Spain on September 24, 1967, along with Saskadoc.
