= VanEnkevort Tug & Barge =

VanEnkevort Tug & Barge is an American shipping line, founded in 1967, that specializes in shipping bulk cargoes in tug barge units.

In 2018 the firm was charged with negligence over allegations an anchor dragging from one of its tugboats, the Clyde S. VanEnkevort, damaged three transmission cables and dented an oil pipeline in the Straits of Mackinac.

VanEnkevort Tug & Barge fleet
image	name	type	acquired	disposition	notes
	Olive L. Moore	tug	1967		
	FC-1	cargo	1968		Acid barge
	FC-2	cargo	1968		Acid barge
	BP-100	cargo	1973		Acid barge
	Buckeye	cargo	1979		
	CY-11	cargo	1979		Acid barge
	Joseph H. Thompson	cargo	1990		Converted to a self-unloading barge
	Joseph H. Thompson Jr.	tug	1993		Built from scrap left over from converting the Joseph H. Thompson to a barge.
	Laura L. VanEnkevort	tug	2019		
	Dirk VanEnkevort	tug			Usually paired with the Michigan Trader.
	Michigan Trader	cargo	2020		Usually paired with the Dirk S. VanEnkevort
	McKee Sons	cargo	1993		
	Clyde S. VanEnkevort	tug	2011		Usually paired with the Erie Trader.
	Joyce L. VanEnkevort	tug			
	Erie Trader	cargo	2012		Usually paired with the Clyde S. VanEnkevort.
