= SS Col. James M. Schoonmaker =

1911 lake freighter

Coordinates: 41°39′23.56″N 83°30′58.86″W

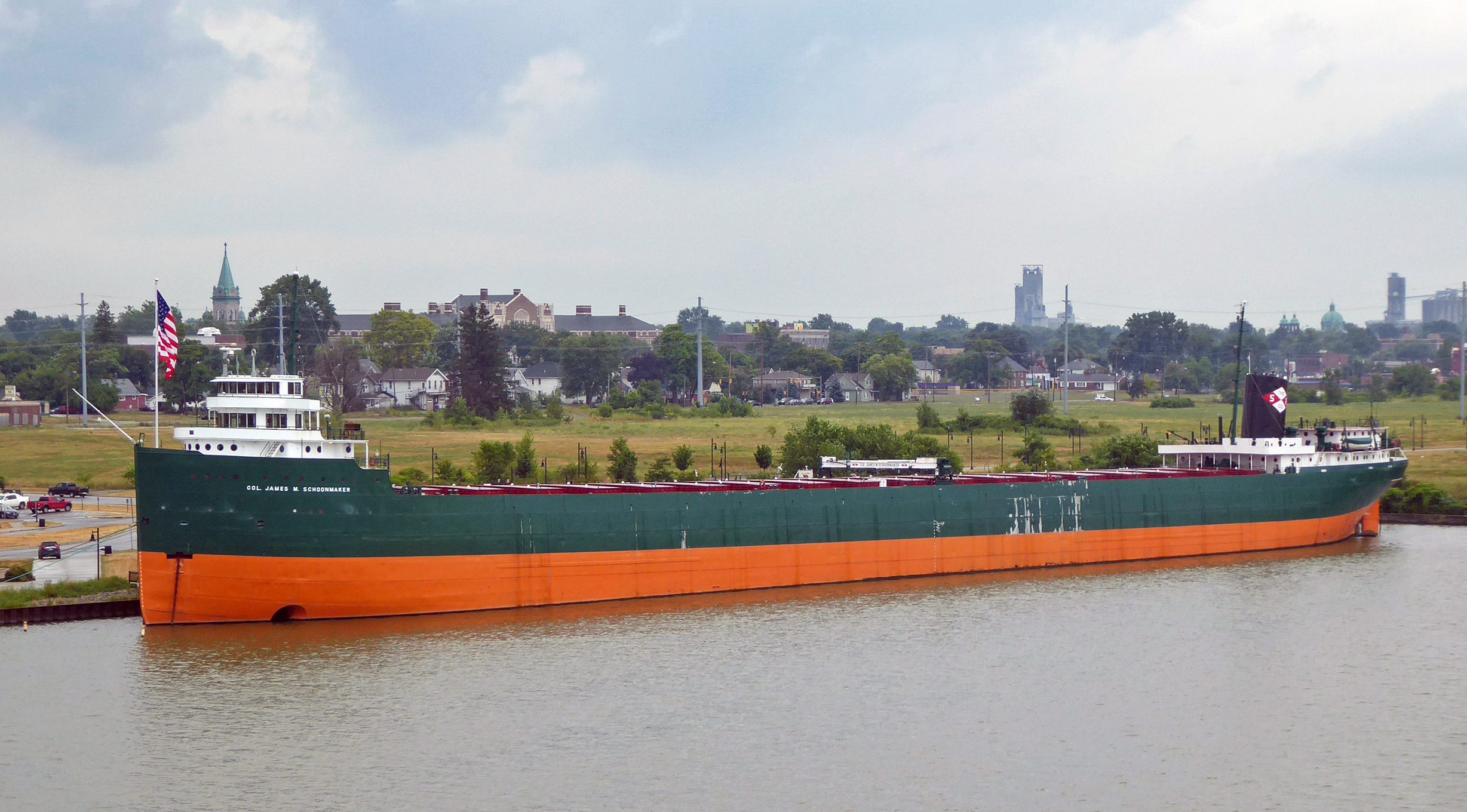
- Col. James M. Schoonmaker as museum ship in 2018

History

United States
- Name: Col James M. Schoonmaker (1911–1972); Willis B. Boyer (1972–2011); Col James M. Schoonmaker (2011–present)
- Owner: Shenango Furnace Company; Interlake Steamship Company; Cleveland Cliffs Iron Company
- Port of registry: Toledo, Ohio
- Builder: Great Lakes Engineering Works
- Yard number: Hull 82
- Launched: 1 July 1911
- Maiden voyage: 11 October 1911
- In service: 11 October 1911
- Out of service: 1980
- Identification: IMO number: 5077228
- Status: Museum ship

General characteristics
- Tonnage: 12,200 GRT
- Length: 617 ft (188 m)
- Beam: 64 ft (20 m)
- Depth: 34 ft (10 m)
- Installed power: triple expansion steam engine
- Speed: 12 knots
- Crew: 29
- Notes: oldest afloat ship to carry the distinction of Queen of the Lakes

Col. James M. Schoonmaker, formerly Willis B. Boyer, is a lake freighter that served as a commercial vessel on the Great Lakes for much of the 20th century. Named for Medal of Honor recipient James Martinus Schoonmaker, it is currently a museum ship in Toledo, Ohio.

== History ==
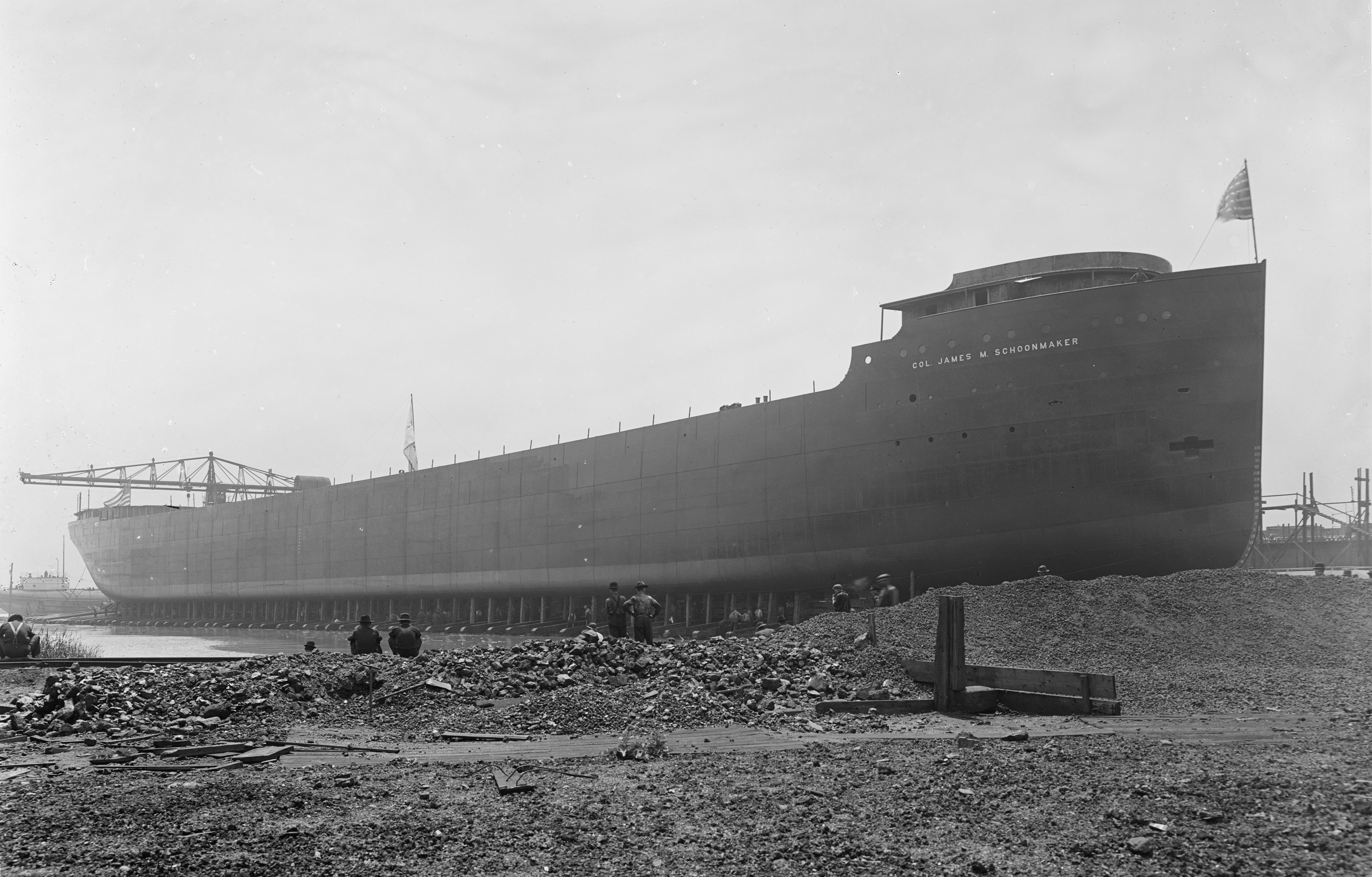
Col. James M. Schoonmaker prior to launching in 1911

The steamship Col. James M. Schoonmaker began life on 1 July 1911 at the Great Lakes Engineering Works in Ecorse, Michigan. At the time of her launch she took the title of Queen of the Lakes which is given to the biggest ship on the Great Lakes. She became the flagship of the Shenango Furnace Company. She broke many cargo records for iron ore, grain and coal in her first year. She was powered by a triple expansion steam engine which was replaced by a steam turbine in 1955. She sailed as part of the Shenango fleet until 1969 when she was sold to the Interlake Steamship Company who chartered Col James M. Schoonmaker to the Republic Steel Corporation. After a three-year charter to that company Interlake decided to sell her to the Cleveland Cliffs Iron Company, who renamed the ship Willis B. Boyer after the company's president. They operated the laker for 7 years in the iron trade until she was laid up in 1980 due to a downturn in the steel industry. After sitting unwanted for 7 years, the city of Toledo decided to purchase her for use as a museum. She sat as the centerpiece of the International Park in that city for several decades before being rechristened back to her original name Col. James M. Schoonmaker and being moved one last time to the site of the National Museum of the Great Lakes on the banks of the Maumee River in Toledo.

== Description ==
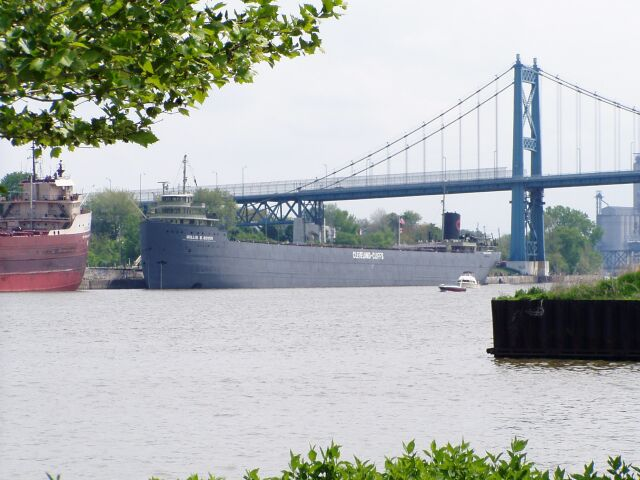
Col. James M. Schoonmaker in 2006, when she was known as the Willis B. Boyer in her Cleveland-Cliffs fleet livery

Col. James M. Schoonmaker is 617 feet (188 m) long overall. She has a beam of 64 feet (20 m) and a depth of over 33 feet (10 m). Her carrying capacity is 12,200 gross tons at 21-foot (6.4 m) draft. A unique feature of the ship is inside her pilothouse. She was one of the few ships on the Great Lakes to have twin steering wheels. The starboard is the main wheel while the other was an auxiliary. As the flagship of the company for many years she was fitted with many features a normal laker would not have. She was fitted with 5 luxury guest suites in the bow of the ship. One of the guests was Andrew Carnegie, whose many business interests coincided with the ship's cargoes. She also carried a guest lounge and dining room for the comfort of passengers.

Col. James M. Schoonmaker was one of several dozen vessels based on the influential design of the J. Pierpont Morgan - known as the "600 footers".

== Museum ship ==
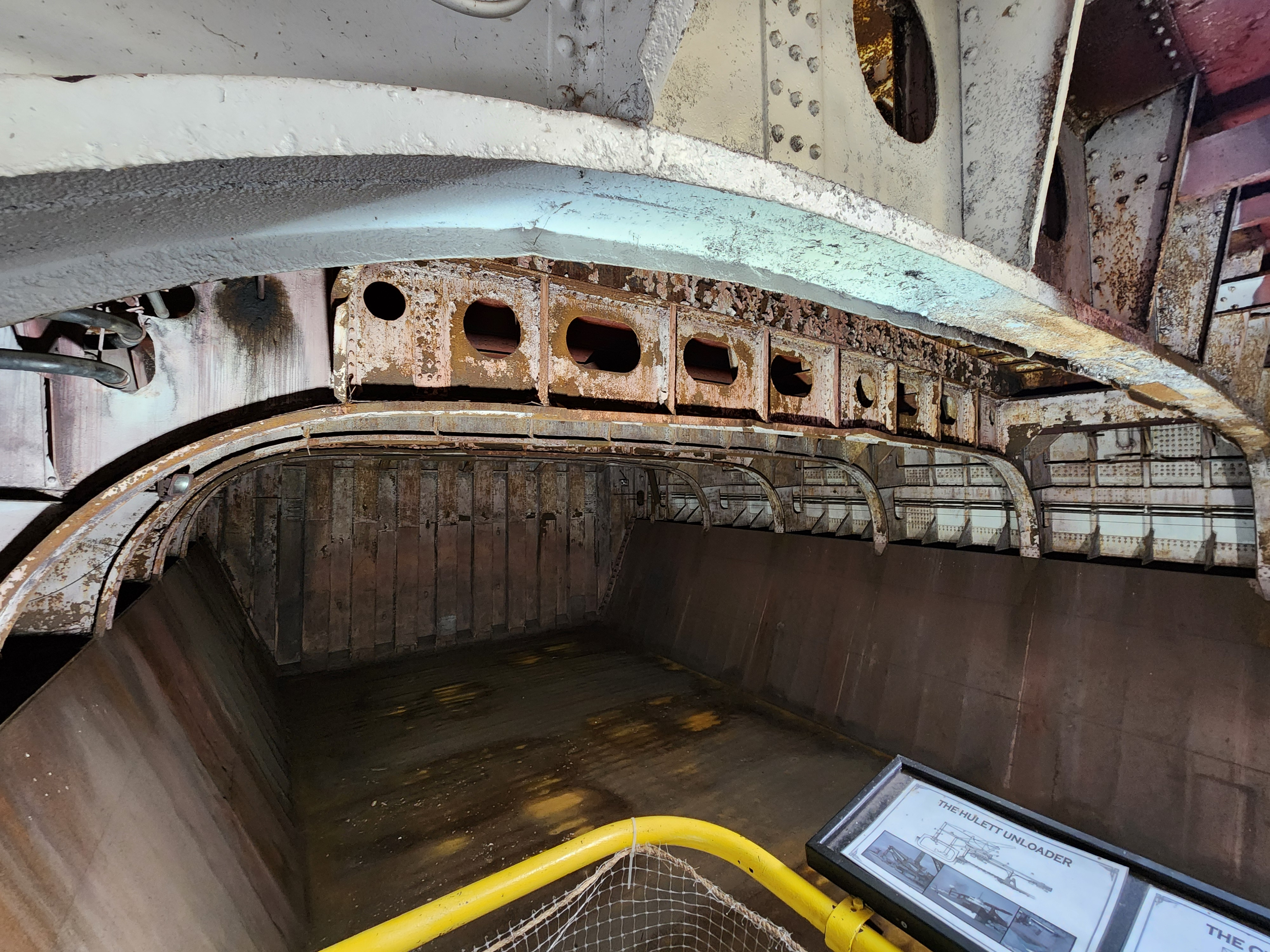
Interior of a cargo hold

On 17 December 2009 the Toledo-Lucas County Port Authority Board of Directors authorized a Memorandum of Understanding with the Great Lakes Historical Society of Vermilion, Ohio, for the creation of the National Museum of the Great Lakes at the Toledo Maritime Center.

Willis B. Boyer was repainted in her Shenango Furnace fleet livery and, on 1 July 2011, rechristened back to her original name, Col. James M. Schoonmaker. In October 2012, Col. James M. Schoonmaker was towed by tugs downriver to her new berth next to the museum. The museum opened in spring 2014.

On the anniversary year, the S.S. Boyer’s Leslie 300 Tyfon steam horn was removed from the vessel, refurbished, and installed at the Huntington Center in Toledo, Ohio. The horn is sounded following goals scored by the Toledo Walleye of the ECHL, connecting the arena tradition to the maritime history of the Great Lakes freighter. The installation was part of efforts to preserve and commemorate the ship’s legacy around the 100th anniversary of the S.S. Boyer.

== See also ==
- James Martinus Schoonmaker
- SS William G. Mather Maritime Museum The Schoonmaker's fleet mate at one time, now a museum ship in Cleveland, Ohio
