= SS Saskadoc =

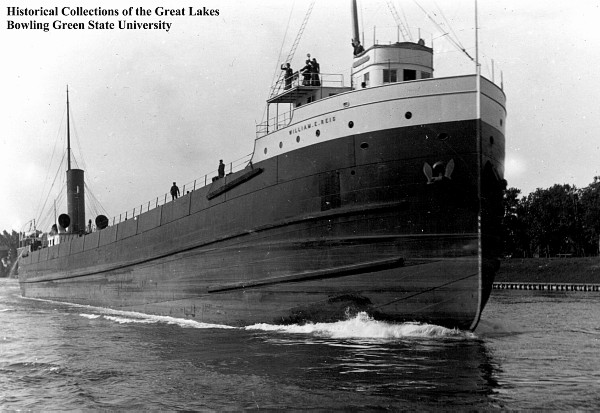
- Saskadoc when she was named William E. Reis

History

United States
- Name: Saskadoc
- Launched: 9 December 1899
- In service: 1900
- Out of service: 1967
- Fate: Scrapped in 1967, in Santander, Spain

General characteristics
- Tonnage: 4,611 GRT
- Length: 422.6 ft (128.8 m)
- Beam: 50.2 ft (15.3 m)
- Draught: 24.1 feet (7.3 m)
- Propulsion: 160 shaft horsepower (120,000,000 mW)
- Notes: Sunk after a collision, in 1907

SS Saskadoc was a lake freighter, built in Cleveland, Ohio, in 1900. She was 422.6 feet (128.8 m) long, 50.2 feet (15.3 m) wide, with a draft of 24.1 feet (7.3 m). She measured 4,611 gross register tons (GRT), and her registered tonnage was 2,876. Her steam engines produced 160 shaft horsepower (120 kW).

She was originally named William E. Reis. She sank in the Saint Clair River on November 1, 1907, after a collision with Monroe C. Smith. She was refloated, repaired, and sold to Interlake Steamship Company, in 1913, which renamed her Uranus.

In 1926 she was sold to Paterson Shipping, which operated her under the name Saskadoc until she was scrapped, in Santander, Spain, in 1967 along with Augustus B. Wolvin.
