= SS D. G. Kerr (1903) =

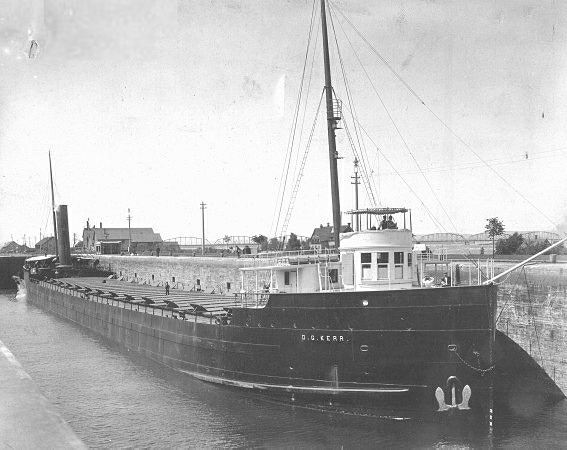
The steamer D. G. Kerr in the Soo Locks.

SS D. G. Kerr was a lake freighter, launched in 1903, for the Provident Steamship Company. She was renamed Harry R. Jones, in 1916, when a larger vessel was given the name D.G. Kerr.

She was sold for scrap in 1960. She was lost at sea, on her way to Scottish ship breakers, when her tow parted.

== Namesake ==
The vessel was named in honor of David Garret Kerr, a Vice President of U.S. Steel.
