= Cliffs Victory =

WWII freighter/cargo vessel

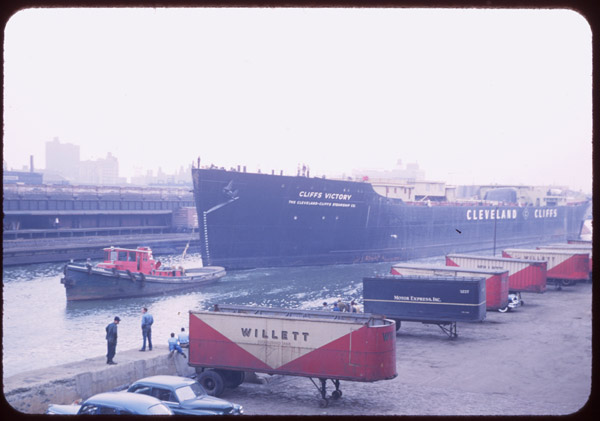
- Cliffs Victory under tow in Chicago, ca. 1951

History

United States
- Name: SS Notre Dame Victory (1945–1950); SS Cliffs Victory (1950–1985); SS Savic (1985)
- Owner: War Shipping Administration (1945–1950)
- Operator: Interocean Shipping Company (1945–1950); Cleveland-Cliffs (1950–1985)
- Port of registry: Wilmington, Delaware
- Builder: Oregon Shipbuilding Corp.
- Yard number: 247522
- Laid down: 26 January 1945
- Launched: 9 March 1945
- Acquired: 6 April 1945
- Notes: Rebuilt as a freighter, 1950
- Fate: Sold for scrap, 1985

General characteristics
- Class & type: VC2-S-AP3 Victory ship
- Tonnage: 7,606 GRT; 4,549 NRT
- Displacement: 15,200 tons
- Length: 439 ft (134 m)
- Beam: 62 ft (19 m)
- Draught: 28 ft (8.5 m)
- Installed power: 8,500 shp (6,300 kW)
- Propulsion: HP & LP turbines geared to a single 20.5-foot (6.2 m) propeller
- Speed: 16.5 knots (30.6 km/h; 19.0 mph)
- Boats & landing craft carried: 4 lifeboats
- Complement: 62 Merchant Marine and 28 US Naval Armed Guards
- Armament: 1 × 5 in (127 mm)/38 cal. gun; 1 × 3 in (76 mm)/50 cal. gun; 8 × 20 mm Oerlikon

General characteristics (after 1950 rebuild)
- Type: Lake freighter
- Tonnage: 9,305 GRT; 6,203 NRT
- Displacement: 15,200 tons
- Length: 604 ft (184 m)
- Beam: 62 ft (19 m)
- Draught: 34 ft (10 m)
- Installed power: 8,500 shp (6,300 kW)
- Speed: 17 knots (31 km/h; 20 mph)

General characteristics (after 1957 lengthening)
- Tonnage: 11,151 GRT; 7,309 NRT
- Displacement: 15,200 tons
- Length: 700 ft (210 m)
- Beam: 62 ft (19 m)
- Draught: 34.33 ft (10.46 m)
- Installed power: 8,500 shp (6,300 kW)
- Speed: 17 knots

SS Cliffs Victory was an American Lake freighter built in 1945 as the Victory ship Notre Dame Victory and operated by Interocean Shipping Company under charter with the Maritime Commission and War Shipping Administration. She was heavily modified and converted to a lake freighter for Cleveland-Cliffs in 1950, and lengthened in 1957.

As the Cliffs Victory, she held the title of Queen of the Lakes, awarded to the largest active vessel on the Great Lakes, from 1957 to 1958, before being overtaken by the SS Edmund Fitzgerald.

== History ==
=== U.S. Navy ===
The ship was built in 1945 by Oregon Shipbuilding Company in Portland, Oregon. She had been mothballed, following her brief World War II service, and, when the Korean War required more vessels on the Great Lakes, she was purchased by Cleveland Cliffs, who planned to adapt her for service on the lakes. According to Mark Thompson, author of Queen of the Lakes, these plans triggered skepticism. But the conversion took only 90 days.

=== Great Lakes service ===
Her adaptation left her with a unique profile. Her original bridge and central superstructure were removed and a new bridge and accommodation was built in the bow, as with all other lake freighters. Her engines were left midships, and the second superstructure, that other lake freighters had above their engines, in the stern was built above her engines in their midship locations. Her hull was lengthened by 165 feet (50 m). But unlike every other lake freighter she still had holds abaft her engine rooms.

She was towed from the yard where she was converted, in Baltimore, Maryland to Chicago, Illinois, and special provisions had to be made so she could travel under the bridges she encountered. She passed under one bridge with only five inches of clearance.

At 620 feet (190 m) she was too long for the final lock on the Chicago Sanitary and Ship Canal. The lockmaster agreed for her bow to be tied in place, right up against the upstream doors to the lock, with her stern sticking out of the open lower doors. He then opened the upstream doors, and the vessel was hauled upstream far enough for the downstream doors to be closed.

Once she began carrying cargo on the lake, at 20 miles per hour (17 kn), she was the fastest freighter on the lakes. When she was lengthened a second time, in 1957, by a further 96 feet (29 m), she became "Queen of the Lakes" –the longest ship on the Great Lakes. She held this record until surpassed by the SS Edmund Fitzgerald on June 7, 1958.

On December 21, 1971, large machinery damage was discovered. The estimated cost of repairs was $100,000. On April 20, 1975, Cliffs Victory collided with the SS Benson Ford while attempting to break the latter vessel free from ice. SS Cliffs Victory went into Fraser Shipyards for port bow repairs and was returned to service on April 24. On December 9, 1976, the ship ran aground near Johnson Point in the St. Marys River while downbound in heavy ice conditions. Cliffs Victory was freed on December 11. The incident later became known as the "worst traffic jam in the river in fifty years", with about seventy vessels delayed by the incident. Assistance of three tugs and a Coast Guard icebreaker were required to free Cliffs Victory. During the resulting inspection, it was discovered that the rudder had been lost.

=== Retirement ===
In 1985, her registry was changed to Panama and was briefly renamed SS Savic. She was sold for scrap the same year to Hai International Corp. in Taiwan.
