= SS Marine Robin =

World War II troop transport ship

- Marine Robin in 1943, possibly on delivery.

History
- Name: Marine Robin; Joseph H. Thompson
- Builder: Sun Shipbuilding and Drydock, Chester, Pa.
- Yard number: 342; USMC number 737
- Laid down: 22 January 1943
- Launched: 6 August 1943
- Completed: Delivery: 29 April 1944
- Identification: U.S. Official Number: 245496; Signal: KWTQ
- Fate: Cut into sections, portions used to construct Joseph H. Thompson

General characteristics Marine Robin
- Type: USMC C4-S-B2
- Tonnage: 11,757 GRT, 8,182 NRT, 15,300 DWT
- Length: 496.2 ft (151.2 m) (registry)
- Beam: 71.7 ft (21.9 m)
- Draft: 30 ft (9.1 m)
- Depth: 25.6 ft (7.8 m)
- Propulsion: Steam turbine, 9,900 shp, single screw
- Speed: 17.5 kn (20.1 mph; 32.4 km/h)
- Capacity: Passengers: 2,439; Cargo: 106,170 cu ft (3,006.4 m^{3})
- Crew: 105
- Notes: Cruise radius: 14,000 nmi (16,000 mi; 26,000 km)

General characteristics Joseph H. Thompson
- Tonnage: 12,217 GRT, 8,469 NRT
- Length: 714 ft 3 in (217.7 m) (overall); 696 ft (212.1 m) (registry)
- Beam: 71.6 ft (21.8 m)
- Depth: 34.7 ft (10.6 m)

Marine Robin was completed for the United States Maritime Commission (USMC) by Sun Shipbuilding & Dry Dock Company in 1944 for service in World War II. The ship was one of the C4 type ship variants built by the company completed as either troop transports for the War Shipping Administration (WSA) or to become Navy hospital ships. The troop transports were operated throughout the war by commercial shipping firms operating as agents for WSA.

The ship, launched in 1943 and delivered to WSA 29 April 1944 for operation by Grace Lines, Inc. made at least one trip, returning to New York 5 June 1945 from Jamaica, before commencing troop transport duties. The ship's first troop transport was from New York to Naples, Italy with operations in that region for two months. During 8–9 August 1944 Marine Robin embarked troops at Naples for the invasion of southern France (Operation Dragoon) landing elements of units not in the assault waves at Yellow Beach near Sainte-Maxime on 15 August.

After return to the Atlantic the ship transported troops to the United Kingdom and, later, ports in France. By 1945 the ship was transporting freed U.S. prisoners of war home. In October 1945 the ship left the Atlantic for Seattle picking up returning veterans in the India-Burma theater arriving in Seattle in December. Later in December the ship was assigned as an India-Burma transport.

In April 1946 the ship was released from troop transport duty but transported German civilians from China to Germany 7 July to 4 August 1945. From March 1947 to October 1951 Marine Robin was in the James River Reserve Fleet. The ship had been sold in 1950 with title passed in 1951 but was not withdrawn by the buyer until 22 October 1951.

The Great Lakes ship Joseph H. Thompson was built from portions of Marine Robin with major reconfiguration and lengthening. The two new parts were brought to Chicago and united and new superstructure added at American Shipbuilding to form what at the time was the longest ship on the lakes and holder of the title "Queen of the Lakes" by reason of length.

That ship was laid up in October 1982 but sold in 1985 to Upper Lakes Shipping, and converted to a self-unloading articulated barge. The after end of the ship was reformed into a "notch" for a tug and steel from the after end used to build the tug for that purpose, named Joseph H. Thompson Jr.. In 2015, after acquisition by new owners, the tug was replaced by a new tug named Laura L. VanEnkevort. The old tug, after refit, was renamed Dirk S. VanEnkevort and paired with the barge Michigan Trader.

== Marine Robin ==
The ship was a sub design of the basic C4 ship, originally designed for American-Hawaiian Lines and taken over by the USMC, designated C4-S-B2. Fourteen of the type were built by Sun Shipbuilding & Dry Dock Company with completion as either War Shipping Administration (WSA) troop transports or Navy hospital ships. The more widely built C4-S-A1 variant were mostly Navy troop transports. (Note: Twenty-nine, of the Kaiser built C4-S-A1 variant were built as Navy troop transports. Three of the Kaiser built C4-S-A3 variants were completed as WSA troop transports.) All the Navy troop ships were given names starting with "General" and all the WSA troop ships names started with "Marine". The Kaiser ships had originally been assigned to Sun but twenty of those hulls were assigned to Kaiser by the USMC to prioritize Sun's construction of tankers.

=== Construction ===
Marine Robin was constructed for the Maritime Commission by Sun Shipbuilding & Dry Dock Company, Chester, Pennsylvania as USMC hull 737, yard hull 342. The keel was laid 22 January 1943 with launch on 6 August 1943 and delivery to the War Shipping Administration on 29 April 1944 at Chester for wartime operation.

=== Registry and characteristics ===
The ship was registered with U.S. Official Number 245496, signal KWTQ, port of Philadelphia, 11,757 GRT, 8,182 NRT, 496.2 ft (151.2 m) registry length, 71.7 ft (21.9 m) beam and depth of 25.6 ft (7.8 m) and crew of 105. Characteristics beyond registry figures are 15,300 DWT, (Note: ShipbuildingHistory figure. Individual MARAD status card apparently shows last four digits based on examination of cards for sister vessels. Marine Robin has "~~5379a~~" with "5457c" typed above. For example, the white Vessel Status Card for sister, Marine Raven has typed "~~15403~~" with "5379" handwritten above. Marine Eagle, the first of the Sun ships of the series, shows full five figures.) 520 ft (158.5 m) length overall, draft of 30 ft (9.1 m), troop capacity of 2,439, cargo capacity 106,170 cu ft (3,006.4 m^{3}) (bale) and a cruise radius of 14,000 nmi (16,000 mi; 26,000 km). Propulsion was by steam turbine with 9,900 shp driving a single screw for a speed of 17 kn (20 mph; 31 km/h) to 17.5 kn (20.1 mph; 32.4 km/h).

=== Service history ===
The ship was operated by Grace Lines, Inc. as the WSA operating agent under a General Agency Agreement effective the day of delivery and throughout the ship's wartime operations until lay up 10 March 1947.

Though recent local sources state the ship was present at the Invasion of Normandy the ship does not appear in the exhaustive list of ships in the invasion's Operation Plan or in the list of ships compiled by the American Merchant Marine at War. Instead, after delivery 29 April, the ship is seen making at least one non troop voyage in which Marine Robin departed Kingston, Jamaica, B.W.I. on May 31 and arrives in New York on 5 June 1944. On that trip agricultural workers from Jamaica were entered as aliens by immigration authorities.

==== Troop transport ====
Marine Robin later departed Norfolk, Virginia on her maiden troop carrying voyage arriving at Naples to spend the next two months operating in the Mediterranean. During that time the ship was assigned to the Task Force 85.3.2, Transport Group, Section II for Operation Dragoon, the invasion of southern France. (Note: Another WSA troop transport, Santa Rosa was in this group.)

The ship embarked troops for those landings at Naples on 8–9 August 1944, including elements of the 117th Cavalry Reconnaissance Squadron (Mechanized) not assigned to the assault force on 8 August. Regimental headquarters and medical detachment of 343rd Engineers boarded in the afternoon of 9 August. (Note: The engineer regiment's 1st Battalion HQ and companies boarded the British troop ship HMT Dilwara on 9 August and the 2nd Battalion HQ and companies boarded USS Thurston on 8 August.) The convoy put to sea on 13 August and after transiting between Corsica and Sardinia was in position just over the horizon from the beaches by 0400 of 15 August. Following the assault troops those aboard Marine Robin landed at Yellow Beach near Sainte-Maxime about three hours after the assault began. The ship's Navy Armed Guard, naval gunners manning the guns of merchant vessels, was awarded a Navy "Battle Star" for the Invasion of Southern France 15 Aug 44-25 Sept-44.

The ship returned to New York via Gibraltar then departing 14 October 1944 in convoy CU 43 of 23 ships arriving Liverpool 25 October. After three more Atlantic voyages transporting troops to the United Kingdom the ship in January 1945 began including ports in France as well as the U.K. including Le Havre and Marseille.

On 2 June 1945 freed prisoners of war boarded the ship at Le Havre for return home. They were addressed by General Eisenhower before departure who explained he would like them to have "first class" accommodations home but there were so many freed POWs the ship could not take them all without double loading, meaning two men shared a bunk alternately in 24 hour periods. The men were given a choice to travel without double loading, leaving many behind, or the hardship. They voted to double bunk and leave no one behind. Marine Robin transited to New York unescorted arriving 8 June 1945 for a brief period of quarantine before debarking in Manhattan to board trains for Camp Shanks.

The Atlantic voyages ended when, on 8 October 1945, Marine Robin voyaged through Suez for Calcutta and Colombo with a final destination of Seattle arriving 1 December 1945.

On that voyage from Atlantic operations to Seattle the ship transported troops from the India-Burma area. On 5 November 2,572 troops were loaded at Calcutta but the ship did not start moving down the Hooghly River until the next day. After a brief stop at Singapore the Marine Robin began the great circle voyage to Seattle passing within sight of Okinawa and glimpsing Mount Fuji before skirting the Aleutians and encountering heavy seas. By late December Marine Robin and Marine Fox were assigned to the India-Burma area for transport of troops home.

Subsequent operations were in the Pacific with Shanghai, Singapore, Calcutta as ports. In February 1946 after arrival in Portland, Oregon Marine Robin made a trip to Yokohama, Japan returning to San Francisco 4 April 1946 and being released from troop transport duty.

==== Postwar transport ====
With the end of troop transport duty the ship assumed other duties. On 7 July 1946 Marine Robin departed Shanghai making her eighteenth voyage, this time with 1,122 German nationals, men, women and children, repatriated from China to Germany. Many had lived in China for decades and some a lifetime. They were apprehensive, in part because officially they were Prisoners of War. The voyage had begun 23 June with 301 passengers boarding at Taku Bar, China, then on 25 June another 133 at Tsingtao before the last boarded at Shanghai 4 through 6 July. Nine of the Shanghai Germans were taken off the ship after a Chinese order allowed them to stay as technical experts and doctors. The seven technical experts were scheduled to work for Chinese firms and the two doctors with the Chinese Health Administration Hospital. Two persons on the sailing list who failed to report filed claims they were not German citizens. Their cases were then under review by Chinese authorities. The actual number reported boarding at Shanghai was 625 leaving more than 1,000 Germans in the city.

Though there was an official no fraternization policy between the Germans and ship's crew and the forty-one embarked Army Voyage Staff representatives of the passengers noted they were treated well and the voyage eased fears of what awaited in Germany. After a gale in the Red Sea (Note: The reference uses "Arabian Gulf," a name in use at the time.) that ripped away sun awnings the ship made a stop at Port Said on 26 July. There the ship took on fuel and supplies were obtained for the passengers to use on arrival in Germany. On 31 July Marine Robin passed Gibraltar to arrive Bremerhaven 4 August 1946. At the time of the source newsletter, the day before arrival, the ship had voyaged 10,800 nmi (12,400 mi; 20,000 km) at an average speed of 16.8 kn (19.3 mph; 31.1 km/h).

=== Reserve fleet ===
After World War II, like many of her C4 sister ships, Marine Robin was placed in reserve. On 10 March 1947 the ship was placed in the James River Reserve Fleet.

On 29 December 1950 a contract of sale with Wisconsin & Michigan Steamship Company was made. On 29 June 1951 title was passed to the company though the ship was to be maintained in custody of the Maritime Administration in the reserve fleet until the ship was withdrawn by the new owner 22 October 1951.

== Joseph H. Thompson ==
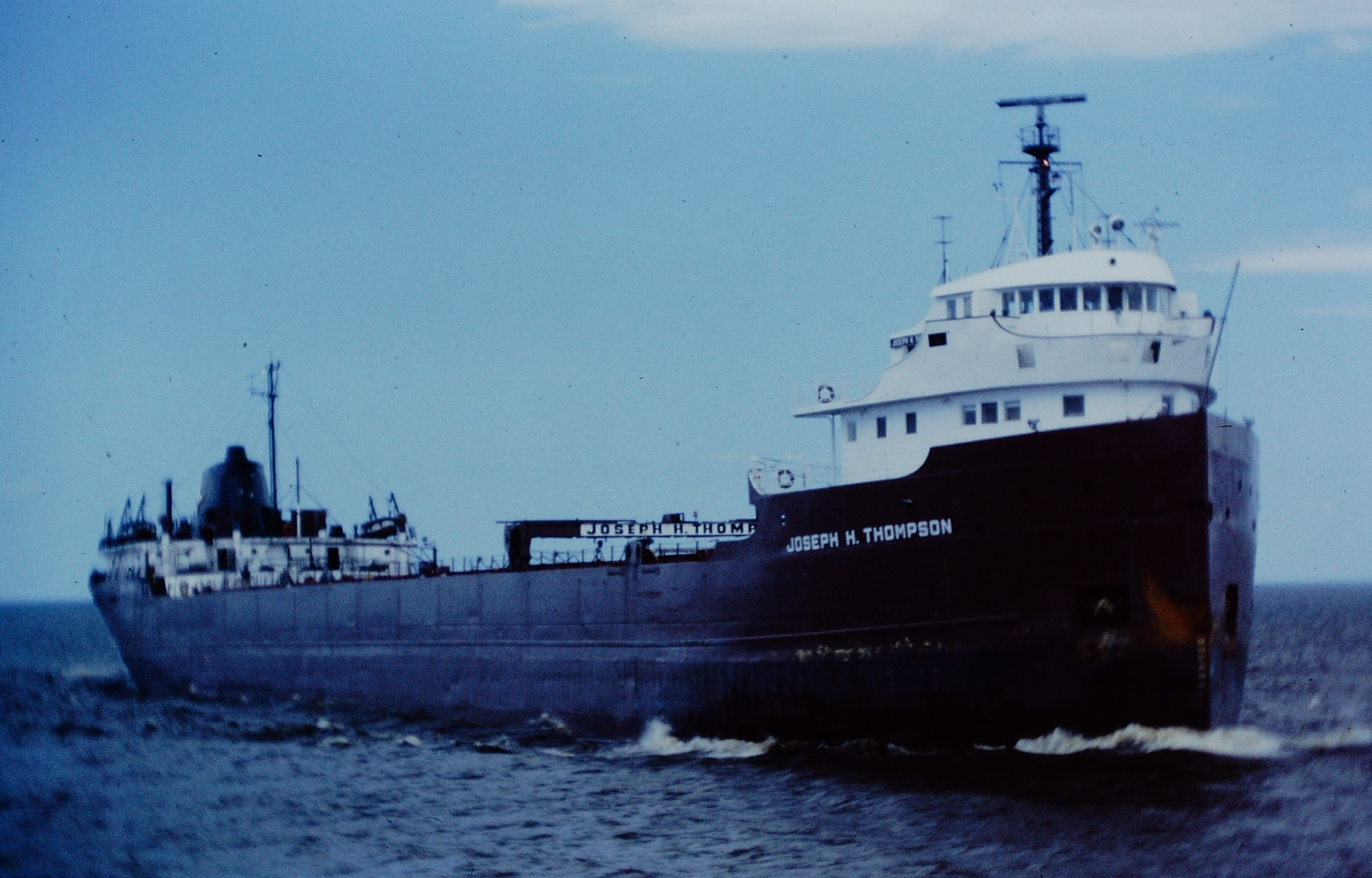
Joseph H. Thompson in 1979

In 1950, Wisconsin & Michigan Steamship Company, a subsidiary of Sand Products Corporation of Detroit, MI, owned by the McKee family, purchased the Marine Robin and her sisters Marine Angel and Marine Star for future conversion into Great Lakes ships. In 1952, she was taken to Maryland Drydock Company in Baltimore, Maryland, where forebody was cut off just aft of her superstructure, and scrapped, and a new forebody and midbody were constructed, and she was lengthened by 199 feet (61 m). She was towed, empty, and half complete, up the Mississippi River and the Chicago Ship Canal, in two parts, so she could transit the shorter locks there. Her stern and bow were connected and her superstructures erected by American Shipbuilding at South Chicago, Illinois. Ownership of the vessel was transferred to Hansand Steamship Company, a 50/50 partnership between Hanna Mining Corp. of Cleveland, OH, and Sand Products Corp. of Detroit, MI. Hanna Mining was contracted to operate the vessel. She was recommissioned as Joseph H. Thompson on November 4, 1952. By length overall, 714 ft 3 in (217.7 m), the ship was longest on the lakes and thus became "Queen of the Lakes" and the longest freighter in the world.

Registry information shows the ship retained the U.S. Official Number assigned to Marine Robin (245496) with the signal/radio call sign of WE5200. The ship was registered as 12,217 GRT, 8,469 NRT, registry length of 696 ft (212.1 m), 71.6 ft (21.8 m) beam, 34.7 ft (10.6 m) depth with ownership by Hansand Steamship Corporation (Delaware) at Wilmington, Delaware.

Joseph H. Thompson was laid up on October 9, 1982, at the Nicholson Dock at Detroit, Michigan.

== Service as an Articulated Tug-Barge (ATB) ==
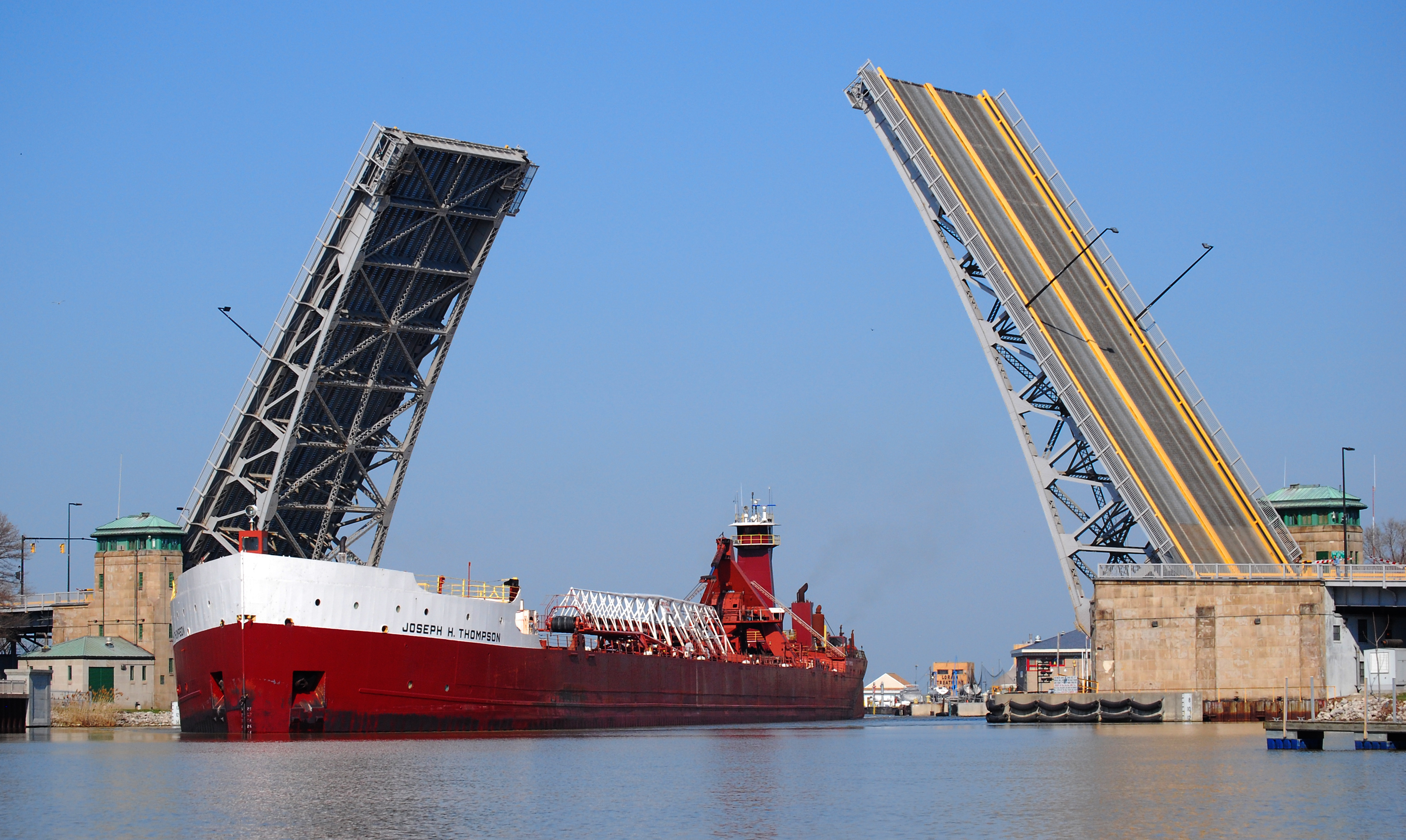
Joseph H. Thompson, after conversion to a notch tug, passes under the Charles Berry Bridge in Lorain, Ohio.

After sale to Upper Lakes Shipping in 1985, she was converted to a self-unloading articulated barge. Her aft cabins and engine room were cut down and a notch for a push tug constructed on her stern, and the cargo hold was reconstructed for a single unloading conveyor belt with a bucket elevator system aft feeding a 250' unloading boom on her spar deck. Her tugboat, Joseph H. Thompson Jr., was constructed from leftover steel from the barge conversion.

In 2015 the pair of vessels were acquired by VanEnkevort Tug & Barge. In 2019 the barge Joseph H. Thompson was assigned a new tug, the Laura L. VanEnkevort. The tug Joseph H. Thompson Jr. underwent a refit at Donjon Shipbuilding & Repair at Erie, Pennsylvania, being renamed Dirk S. VanEnkevort. She was paired with the barge Michigan Trader. The Joseph H. Thompson continued serving with VanEnkevort Tug & Barge until 2023 when she failed a 5 year inspection and she was sold for scrap, and she arrived at Port Colborne, Ontario and scrap work started not long after.

== See also ==
- Type C4-class ship
- War Shipping Administration
- United States Maritime Commission
- Operation Dragoon
- Great Lakes freighter
- Queen of the Lakes
- James River Reserve Fleet
