= David Garret Kerr =

American mining engineer

David Garret Kerr was an American mining engineer.

He graduated Lehigh University in 1884. He worked for Carnegie Steel, and its successor, U.S. Steel, for his entire working life. He rose from lab technician to Vice President.

Kerr is considered influential because, in 1880, he was sent to Sweden, to study and bring back, techniques for preparing "spiegeleisen", a key ingredient in newly developed Swedish steels.

US Steel made him its Vice President in charge of the production and distribution of ore, limestone and coal, in 1909. He retained that position until 1932, when he retired.

== Legacy ==
His alma mater, Lehigh University, granted him an honorary degree, in 1933.

In 1903 a lake freighter was named the D.G. Kerr. When it was sold, and renamed, a second vessel, was commissioned the D.G. Kerr, in 1916.
