= PS Frontenac =

Nineteenth century paddle steamer

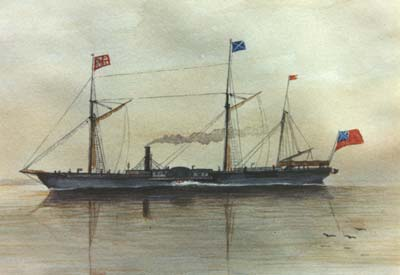
- Frontenac by Captain James Van Clev

History
- Name: Frontenac
- Route: Kingston - York (now Toronto) - Niagara-on-the-Lake
- Cost: £15,000
- Laid down: 1816
- Launched: 1816
- Maiden voyage: 1817
- Out of service: 1827
- Fate: Burned while being scrapped

General characteristics
- Class & type: Paddle steamer
- Tonnage: c700
- Speed: 8 mph (13 km/h)

Frontenac was a steamboat, the first paddle steamer launched on the Canadian side of the Great Lakes, in 1816.

Built in Ernesttown, Upper Canada, by American contractors for Kingston businessmen during 1816 at a cost of £15,000, she entered service in spring 1817. Frontenac conducted regular runs across Lake Ontario between Kingston, York (now Toronto), and Niagara-on-the-Lake. The round trip fare between Kingston and York was $18 ($12 one way) in cabin class.

Frontenac typically generated about 50 horsepower (using the original Boulton and Watt formula), which was too little for a ship of her size, and she was often outperformed by sailing craft. She rarely managed to make money in eight years; the provincial population was simply too small.

Flag of Bath, Ontario, adopted in 1997, featuring a depiction of the Frontenac on the shield.

Frontenac was sold for £1550 to John Hamilton in 1824, who persisted two more unsuccessful years before selling her for scrap at Niagara in 1827. Before she could be scrapped, she burned to the waterline due to arson. Parts of her engines were salvaged and used later in the Alciope on Lake Ontario and Adelaide on Lake Erie.

== See also ==
- Walk-in-the-water (steamboat) – first steamboat on Lakes Erie, Huron and Michigan

== Sources ==
- Lewis, Walter (1988), "Frontenac", The Canadian Encyclopedia, vol. 2, Edmonton: Hurtig Publishers, p. 850
- Lewis, Walter (Summer 1987). "The Frontenac: A Reappraisal". FreshWater. 2 (1): 28–39.
