= SS Elbert H. Gary =

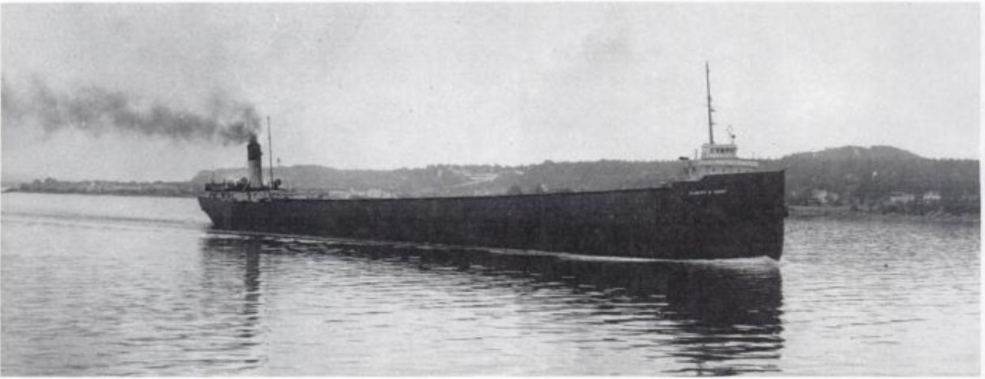
Lake freighter Elbert H. Gary, passing Mackinac Island on her maiden voyage, in 1905.

SS Elbert H. Gary was a 576 feet (176 m) lake freighter. She was Queen of the Lakes - the longest ship on the Great Lakes - when she was launched in 1905.

She was the first newly built vessel in the fleet of US Steel.
