= SS D. G. Kerr (1916) =

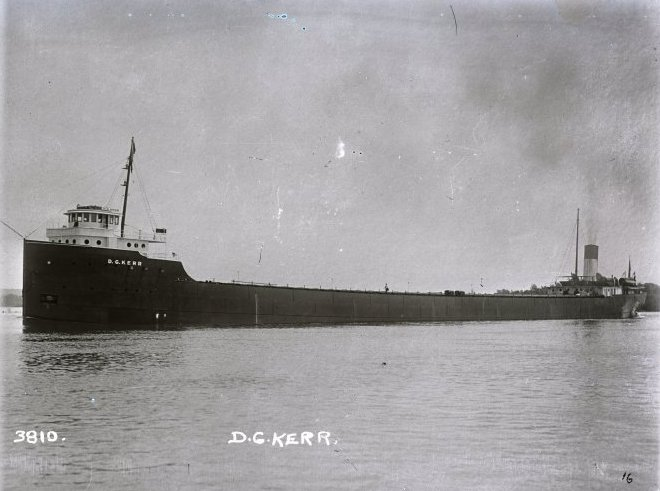
D.G. Kerr, circa 1920.

D. G. Kerr was a lake freighter, launched in 1916, for the Pittsburg Steamship Company. Ownership was transferred to US Steel, in 1952. She is considered to be a "600 footer", a vessel whose design was based on the J. Pierpont Morgan, built in 1903.

In 1921 the DG Kerr set a record, loading her entire capacity of 12,507 tons of ore, in just 16 and a half minutes.

She ran aground in 1970, and was permanently laid up in 1975. She was lost, off the Azores, while under tow to a Spanish ship breaker's yard.

== Namesake ==
The vessel was named in honor of David Garret Kerr, a Vice President of U.S. Steel.
