= USS Superior =

USS Superior is a name given to two ships of the United States Navy:

- USS Superior (1814), a frigate built in 1814 at Sackett's Harbor, New York.
- USS Superior (AM-311), a minesweeper, commissioned 1944, decommissioned 1947.
