= SS J. Pierpont Morgan =

American steel-hulled, propeller-driven Great Lakes freighter

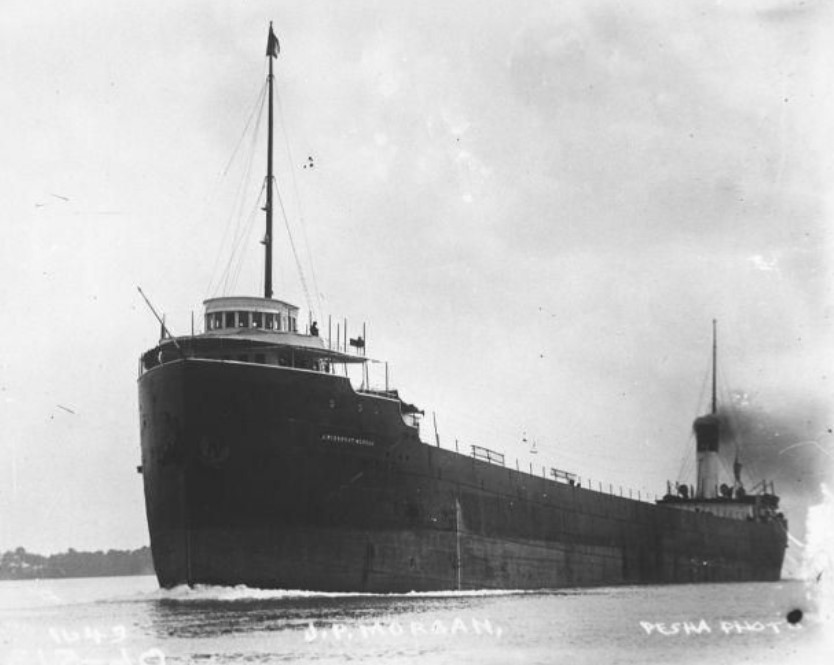
- J. Pierpont Morgan underway

History

United States
- Name: J. Pierpont Morgan (1906-1965); Heron Bay (1966-1978); Heron B (1978-1979)
- Namesake: J.P. Morgan
- Operator: Pittsburgh Steamship Company (1906-1951); U.S. Steel (1951-1965); Comet Enterprises (1965-1966); Trico Enterprises (1966-1978); Union Pipe & Machinery Ltd. (1978-1979)
- Port of registry: United States Duluth, Minnesota
- Builder: Chicago Shipbuilding Company
- Yard number: 68
- Launched: April 28, 1906
- Completed: 1906
- In service: June 1906
- Out of service: 1979
- Identification: U.S. Registry #203155; IMO number: 5166902
- Fate: Scrapped in 1979, in Lauzon, Quebec
- Notes: The Morgan was the first 600-foot vessel on the lakes

General characteristics
- Class & type: Bulk Freighter
- Tonnage: 7,161 gross 5,530 net
- Length: 601 ft (183 m) LOA; 580 ft (180 m) LBP
- Beam: 58 ft (18 m)
- Height: 32 ft (9.8 m)
- Installed power: 2 x Scotch marine boilers
- Propulsion: 1,800 horsepower triple expansion steam engine attached to a single fixed pitch propeller
- Speed: 10 knots

The J. Pierpont Morgan, named after legendary banking titan J. P. Morgan, was a 601-foot-long (183 m) American steel-hulled, propeller-driven Great Lakes freighter that was a product of the Chicago Shipbuilding Company of Chicago, Illinois. The Morgan hauled bulk cargoes such as iron ore, coal, grain and occasionally limestone across the Great Lakes of North America. She served her whole career without any major incidents. She was the first of three identical sister ships, these were the Henry H. Rogers and the Norman B. Ream.

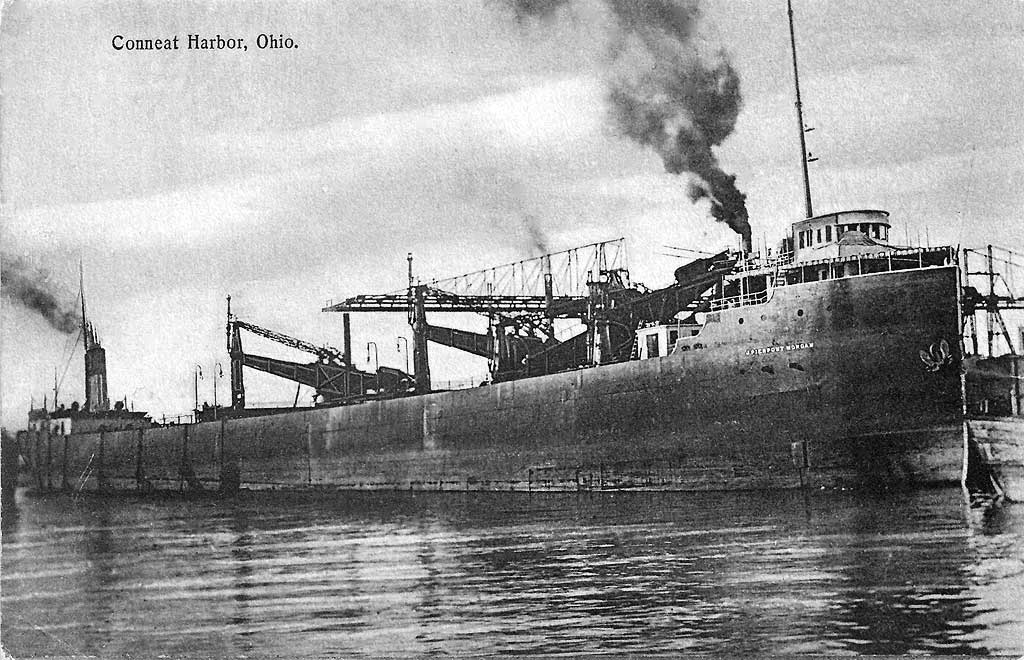
Early postcard of the J. Pierpont Morgan

== Queen of the Lakes ==
The J. Pierpont Morgan was the Queen of the Lakes, when launched – i.e. the longest ship on the Great Lakes. She was Queen of the Lakes from April 12, 1906, to August 18, 1906. According to Mark L. Thompson, author of Queen of the Lakes, she was the first of the "600-footers", a series of dozens of lake freighters built to her design. Thompson wrote that "the design of the Morgan represented a plateau of perfection in the endless evolution of the bulk freighter."

According to Thompson, prior to the construction of the J. Pierpont Morgan, vessel design re-use rarely extended for than three or four sister ships. But, he wrote, between 56 and 76 vessels were built to her design.

== Name change and modifications ==
The Morgan was launched on April 28, 1906, as hull #68. She was built for the Pittsburgh Steamship Company of Cleveland, Ohio. The Morgan played an important role in Great Lakes shipping industry, because she was the first 600-foot vessel on the lakes. Because of her enormous size the Morgan was awarded the unofficial title "Queen of the Lakes".

The Morgan had two new Babcock & Wilcox water tube boilers installed in April 1937. The Morgan had two hopper sides and a new tank top installed in April 1940. In 1952 the Morgan was purchased by U.S. Steel. In November 1960 the Morgan was laid up in Duluth, Minnesota. She remained in layup until 1965 when the Morgan was purchased by the Canadian company, Comet Enterprises Ltd. of Hamilton, Bermuda. The Morgan was rebuilt in 1965, in Port Arthur. She returned to the lakes in 1966, named Heron Bay. On November 4, 1978, the Heron Bay was laid up in Lauzon, Quebec. That same year the Heron Bay was sold to the Union Pipe & Machinery Ltd. of Montreal, Quebec, where she was renamed Heron B. On March 30, 1979, the scrapping of the Heron B began in Lauzon, Quebec. The scrapping was completed in late 1979.

== See also ==
- 1940 Armistice Day Blizzard
- Great Lakes Storm of 1913
- List of storms on the Great Lakes
- Mataafa Storm
- Largest shipwrecks on the Great Lakes
- List of shipwrecks on the Great Lakes
- SS Edmund Fitzgerald
- SS Carl D. Bradley
- SS Cedarville
- SS Chester A. Congdon
- SS James Carruthers
- SS Henry B. Smith
- SS Emperor
- SS Isaac M. Scott (1909)
- SS Charles S. Price
- SS D.M. Clemson (1903)
