= Pittsburgh Mercantile Company Building =

- U.S. National Register of Historic Places
- Pittsburgh Landmark – PHLF
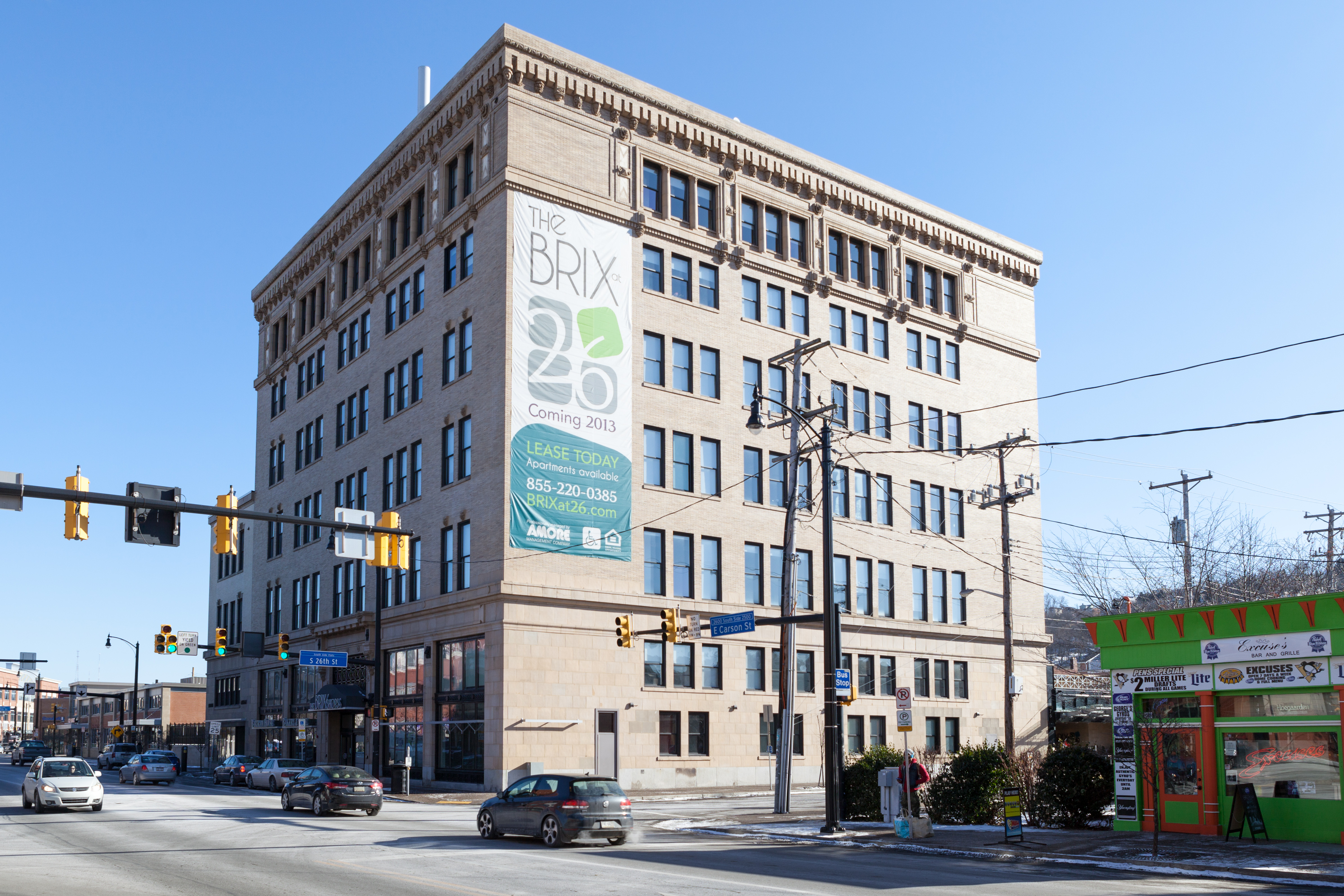
- February 2015, looking east on East Carson St

- Location within Pittsburgh Location within Pennsylvania Location within the United States
- Location: 2600 East Carson Street, Pittsburgh, Pennsylvania
- Coordinates: 40°25′38″N 79°58′06″W
- Area: December 29, 2014
- Built: 1907 to 1908
- Architect: Rutan & Russell
- Architectural style: Beaux Arts and Commercial Style
- NRHP reference No.: 14001099

Significant dates
- Added to NRHP: May 8, 2013
- Designated PHLF: 2014

The Pittsburgh Mercantile Company Building in the South Side Flats neighborhood of Pittsburgh, Pennsylvania, United States, was built in 1907 to 1908 and functioned as the company store for the nearby Jones and Laughlin Steel Company. It is currently used as an apartment building. The structure was listed in the National Register of Historic Places in 2014.

== Architecture ==
The original portion of the building, constructed during 1907 and 1908, is six stories tall, buff-colored Roman brick with steel frame, with concrete floors and roof. Fronting on East Carson street, the main commercial road in the South Side Flats, it is 108 ft wide by 116 ft deep, with terra cotta first-story wall cladding and cornice trim work. A three-story-and-mezzanine addition, 36 ft wide by 116 ft deep, was built on the building's east side in 1936. A one-story addition was added to the rear in 1950. The building has been renovated and rehabilitated several times, including 1967–1968 when it was purchased by Goodwill Industries of Pittsburgh for use as its headquarters, store, and workshop, and again in 2012 when it was converted to use as an apartment building.

== Company store ==
Though Pennsylvania had laws in place to keep industrial firms from owning company stores directly, these laws were easily evaded by having a separate corporation own the store; such was the case with J&L Steel and the Pittsburgh Mercantile Company. The original officers of the Pittsburgh Mercantile Company were the same as the officers of J&L. Arguments against the company store system, which had dated back to 1464 in England with what was there called the truck system, included the potential of abuse by paying workers in scrip, which could only be used at company's facilities. Arguments in favor included reducing the problems faced by immigrant workers that were unfamiliar with the language, customs, and problems of acquiring clothing, housing, and food, by setting up company housing and stores with payment in scrip.

Pittsburgh Mercantile Company ran a general purpose store at its South Side Flats flagship location, including groceries, dry goods, hardware, and home furnishings. At least seven other locations were established, including Aliquippa and California, Pennsylvania.

While hearings, investigations and legislation to end the scrip/company store system continued through the Great Depression and beyond, the scrip system didn't end until 1950. The Pittsburgh Mercantile Company remained profitable for another decade after that.
