= Jones Memorial Library =

Jones Memorial Library may refer to:

- Jones Memorial Library (Lynchburg, Virginia), United States
- B.F. Jones Memorial Library, Aliquippa, Pennsylvania, United States
