= Rutan & Russell =

American architectural firm

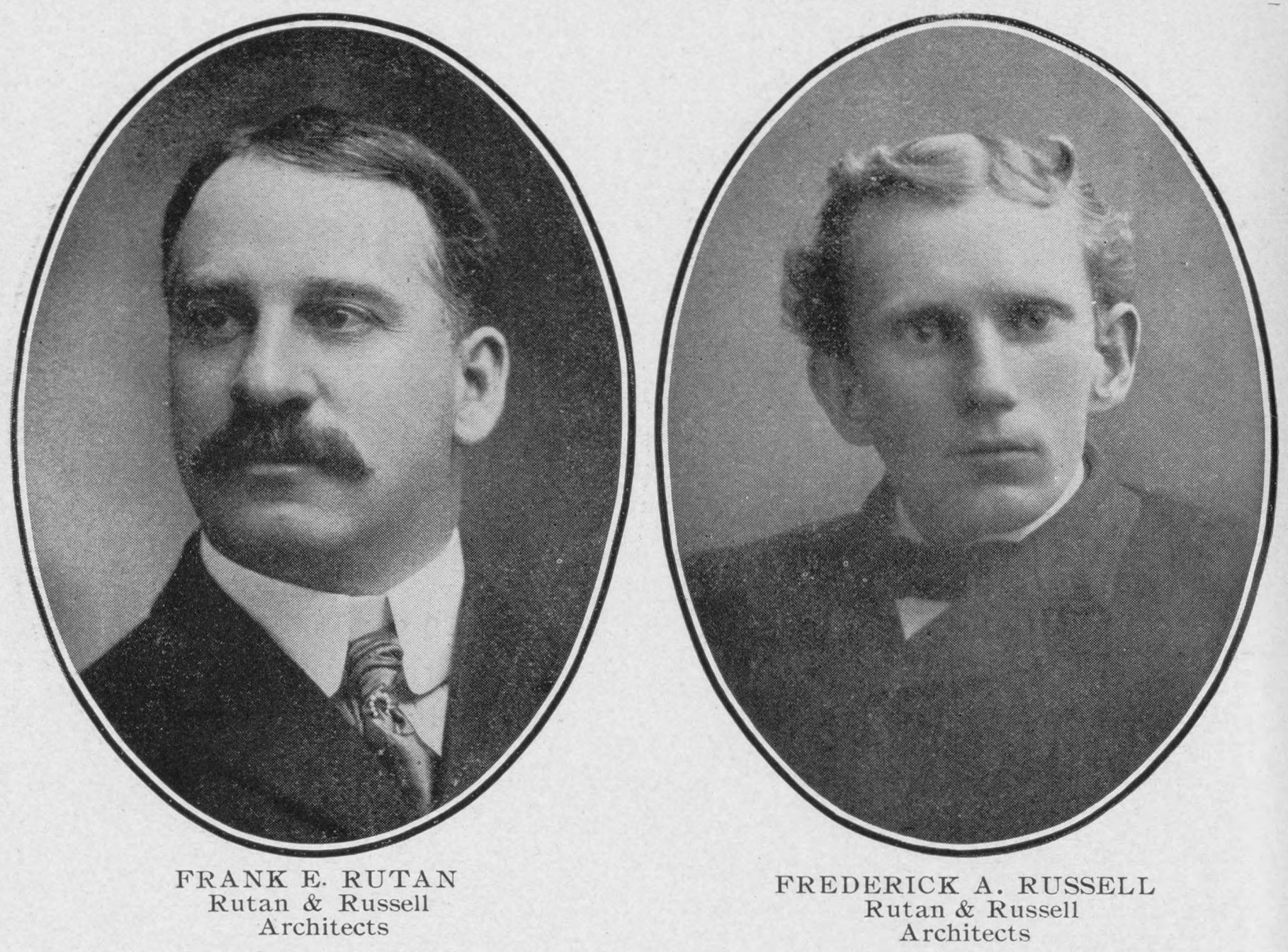
- Rutan and Russell as depicted in Palmer's Pictorial Pittsburgh, 1905

Practice information
- Partners: Frank E. Rutan; Frederick A. Russell; Edward P. Russell; Eric Fisher Wood
- Founders: Frank E. Rutan; Frederick A. Russell
- Founded: 1896
- Dissolved: 1922
- Location: Pittsburgh, Pennsylvania

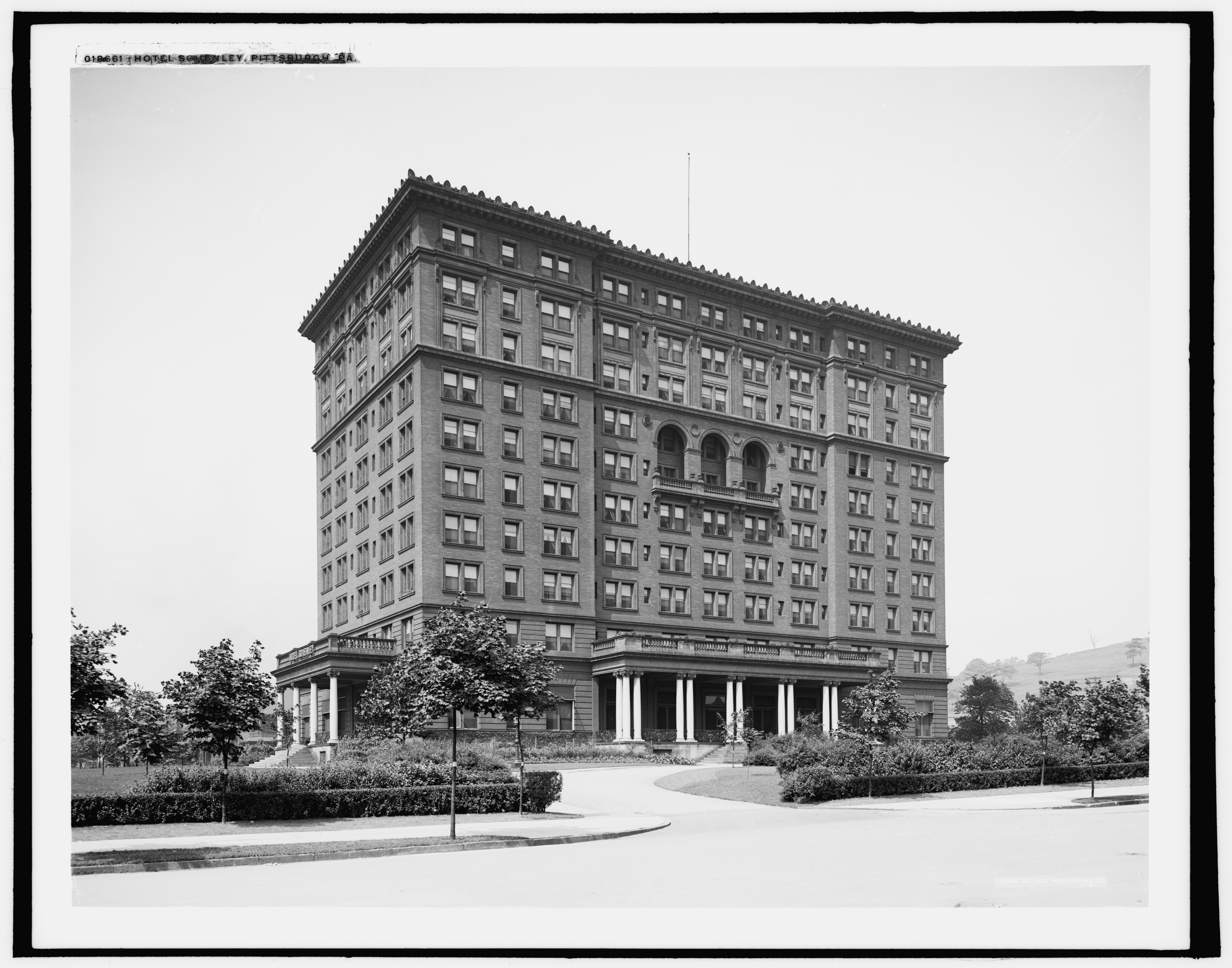
The Schenley Hotel, now the William Pitt Union, designed by Rutan & Russell and completed in 1898.

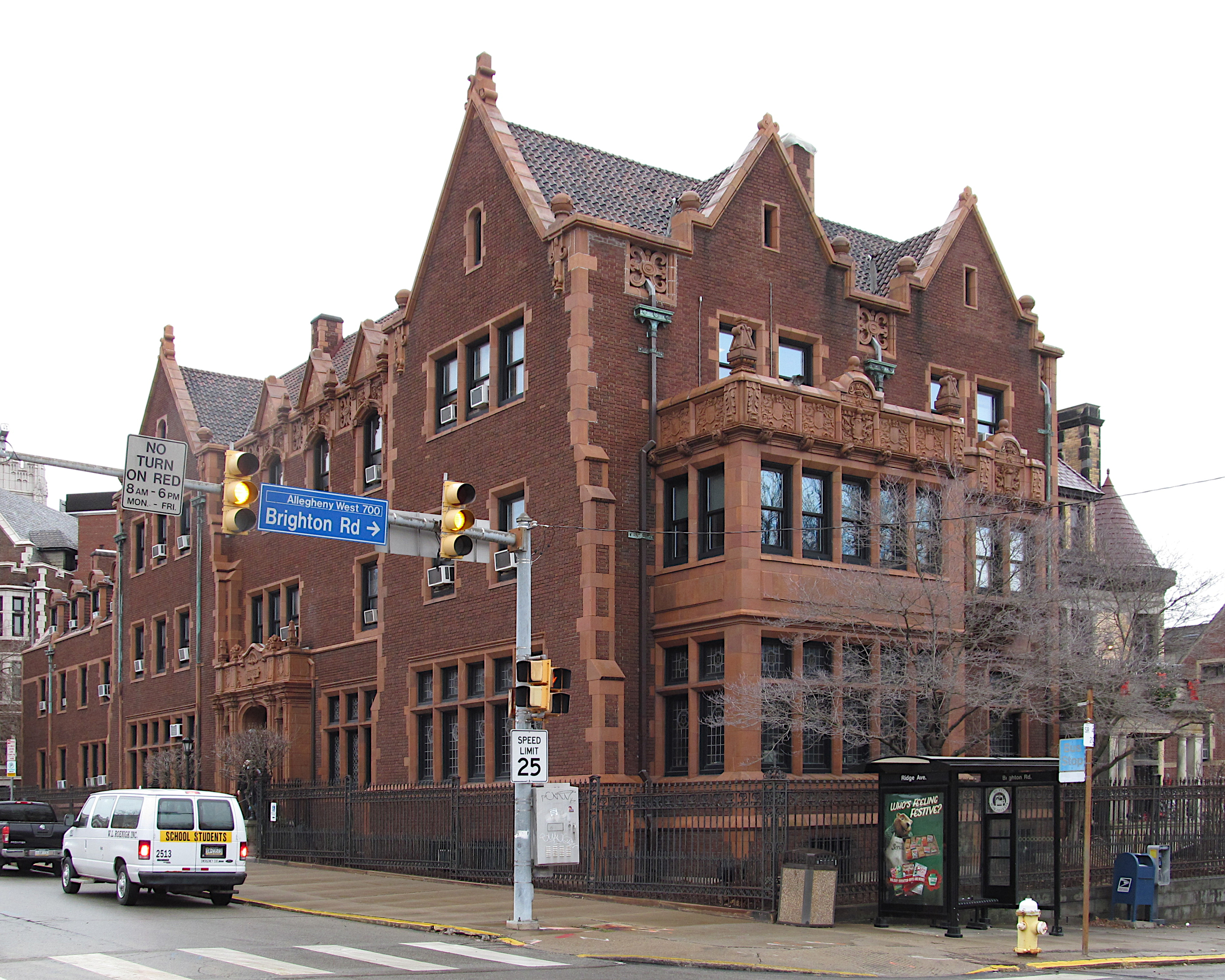
The B. F. Jones house in the Allegheny West neighborhood of Pittsburgh, completed in 1910.

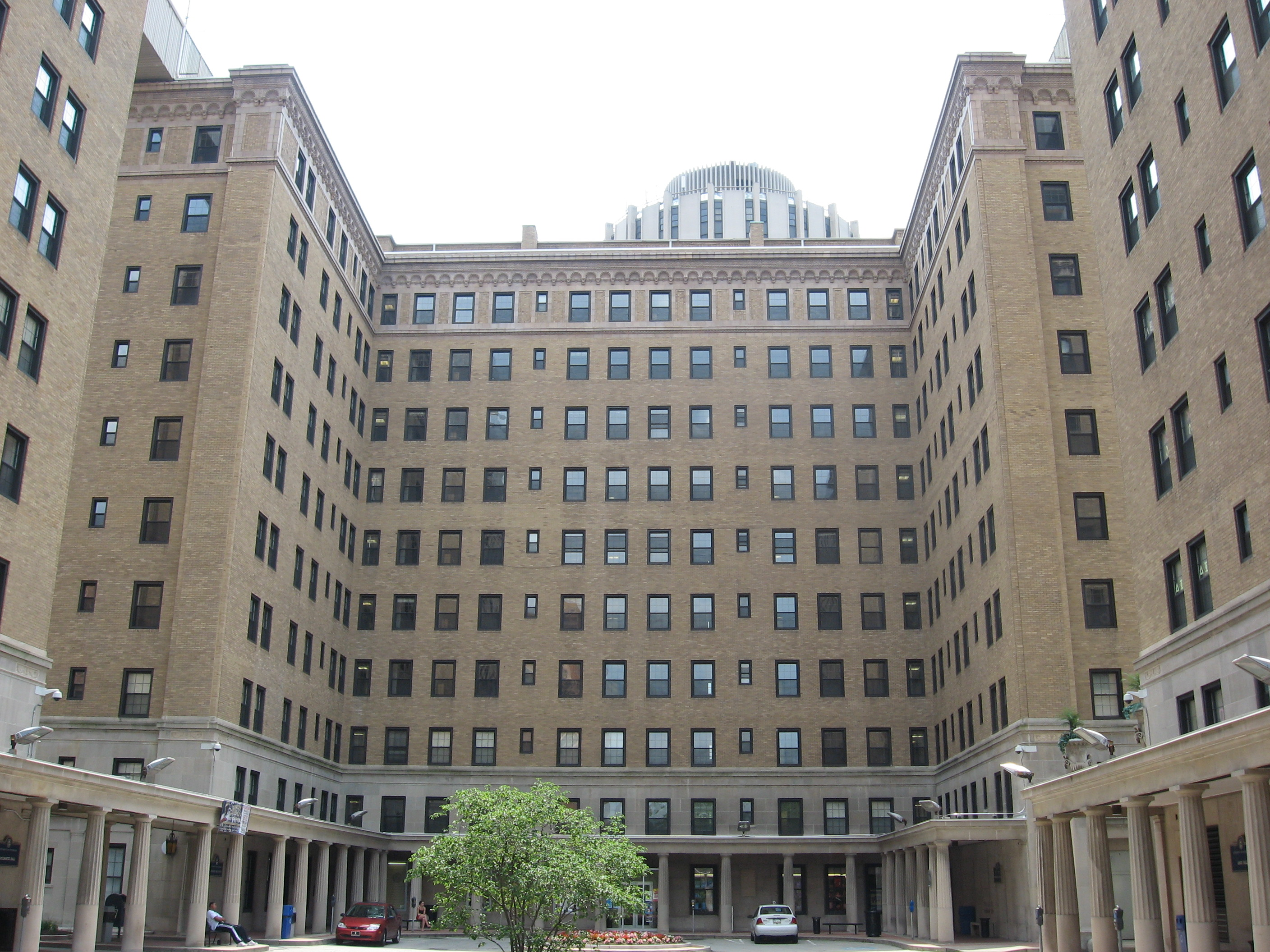
Part of the Schenley Apartments, now the Schenley Quadrangle, designed by Rutan, Russell & Wood in collaboration with Henry Hornbostel and completed in 1924.

Rutan & Russell was an American architectural firm from Pittsburgh, Pennsylvania, active from 1896 to 1922. The named partners were Frank E. Rutan (1863–1911) and Frederick A. Russell (1861–1921), with the later additions of Edward P. Russell (1868–1920) and Eric Fisher Wood (1889–1962), a notable architect in his own right.

== Founders and history ==
Franklin Elmer Rutan, known professionally as Frank E. Rutan, was born February 17, 1863, in Newark, New Jersey to Nicholas Warren Rutan and Sarah Elizabeth (Marsh) Rutan. He was educated in the Newark public schools and in 1881 joined his brother Charles Hercules Rutan in the studio of architect Henry Hobson Richardson in Brookline, Massachusetts. Frederick Albert Russell was born August 16, 1861, in Canton, Ohio. In 1883 he joined Richardson in Brookline, and was assigned to the Allegheny County Courthouse project. Early in 1886 Richardson sent Russell to Pittsburgh, where he joined Frank E. Alden in superintending that building's construction. While work was still underway, Richardson died, and the firm of Shepley, Rutan & Coolidge was formed to succeed to the practice. In March 1887 Alden left to join Longfellow, Alden & Harlow, and Rutan was then sent to assist Russell. Only three months later Russell joined Alden, leaving Rutan to see the courthouse project to completion. When it was finished in 1888, Rutan remained the firm's representative in Pittsburgh, supervising other projects including the Masonic Temple (1888) and the Shadyside Presbyterian Church (1889-90). Shepley, Rutan & Coolidge stopped pursuing Pittsburgh work in 1891, when they lost the competition to design the Carnegie Library of Pittsburgh to Longfellow, Alden & Harlow. Rutan then joined Alden. In 1896, as the partnership of Longfellow, Alden & Harlow was being dissolved, Rutan and Russell left to form the firm of Rutan & Russell.

Rutan and Russell were in partnership until Rutan's death on February 25, 1911, in Atlantic City, New Jersey. Russell then formed a partnership with his younger brother, Edward Pollard Russell, who had worked for Longfellow, Alden & Harlow before joining Rutan & Russell. The younger Russell died January 15, 1920, in Pittsburgh. Frederick A. Russell then formed a partnership with Eric Fisher Wood, who had joined the firm a year before. Russell died February 25, 1921, exactly ten years after Rutan. In 1922 Wood reorganized the firm under his own name.

In 1901 both Rutan and Russell joined the American Institute of Architects. Russell was elected a Fellow in 1915, and his brother joined in 1916. All three were active in the organization until their deaths.

== Architectural works ==
- Schenley Hotel, 3959 Fifth Ave, Pittsburgh, Pennsylvania (1898)
- St. Augustine Church, (Note: Designed by employee John T. Comès.) 225 37th St, Pittsburgh, Pennsylvania (1899-1901)
- George Westinghouse Jones house, 1944 Union St, Niskayuna, New York (circa 1900, NRHP 2004)
- Pittsburgh Wash House and Public Baths Building, 3495 Butler St, Pittsburgh, Pennsylvania (1904)
- Century Building, 130 7th St, Pittsburgh, Pennsylvania (1906–07, NRHP 2008)
- City of Pittsburgh Department of Water, (Note: Designed in association with Thomas H. Scott.) 226 Delafield Rd, Pittsburgh, Pennsylvania (1907)
- Memorial Home for Crippled Children (now known as The Children's Institute), 1405 Shady Ave, Pittsburgh, Pennsylvania (circa 1907)
- Pittsburgh Mercantile Company Building, 2600 E Carson St, Pittsburgh, Pennsylvania (1907–08, NRHP 2014)
- B. F. Jones house, 808 Ridge Ave, Pittsburgh, Pennsylvania (1908–10)
- Schenley Park Café and Visitor Center, Schenley Park, Pittsburgh, Pennsylvania (1910)
- Cottesmore Hall (Wallace H. Rowe House), Cobourg, Ontario (1910)
- Diamond Market House, Pittsburgh, Pennsylvania (1915, demolished 1961)
- Schenley Apartments, (Note: Designed in association with Henry Hornbostel.) Fifth and Thackeray Aves, Pittsburgh, Pennsylvania (1922–24)

== Gallery of architectural works ==
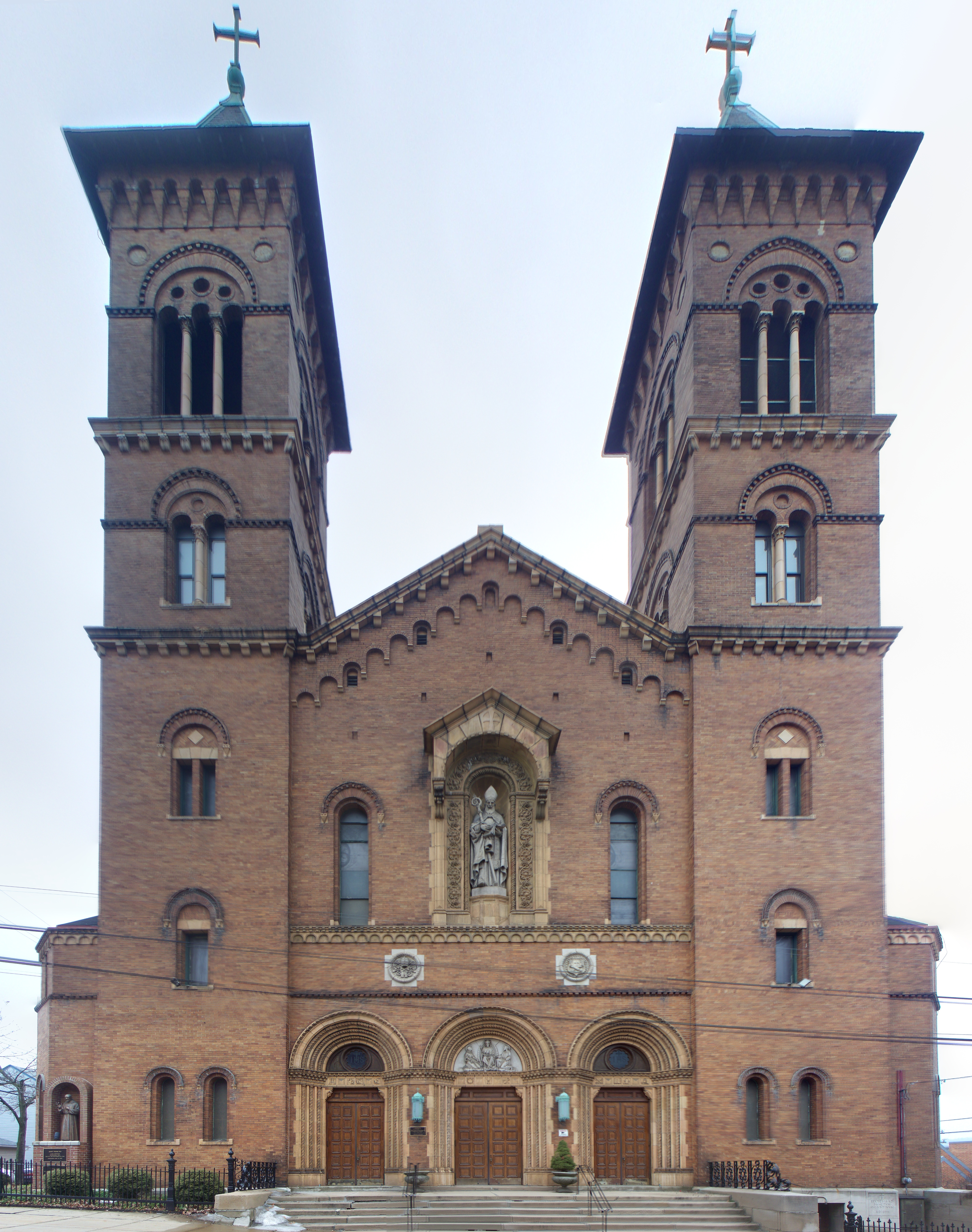
St. Augustine Church, Pittsburgh, Pennsylvania, 1899–1901.

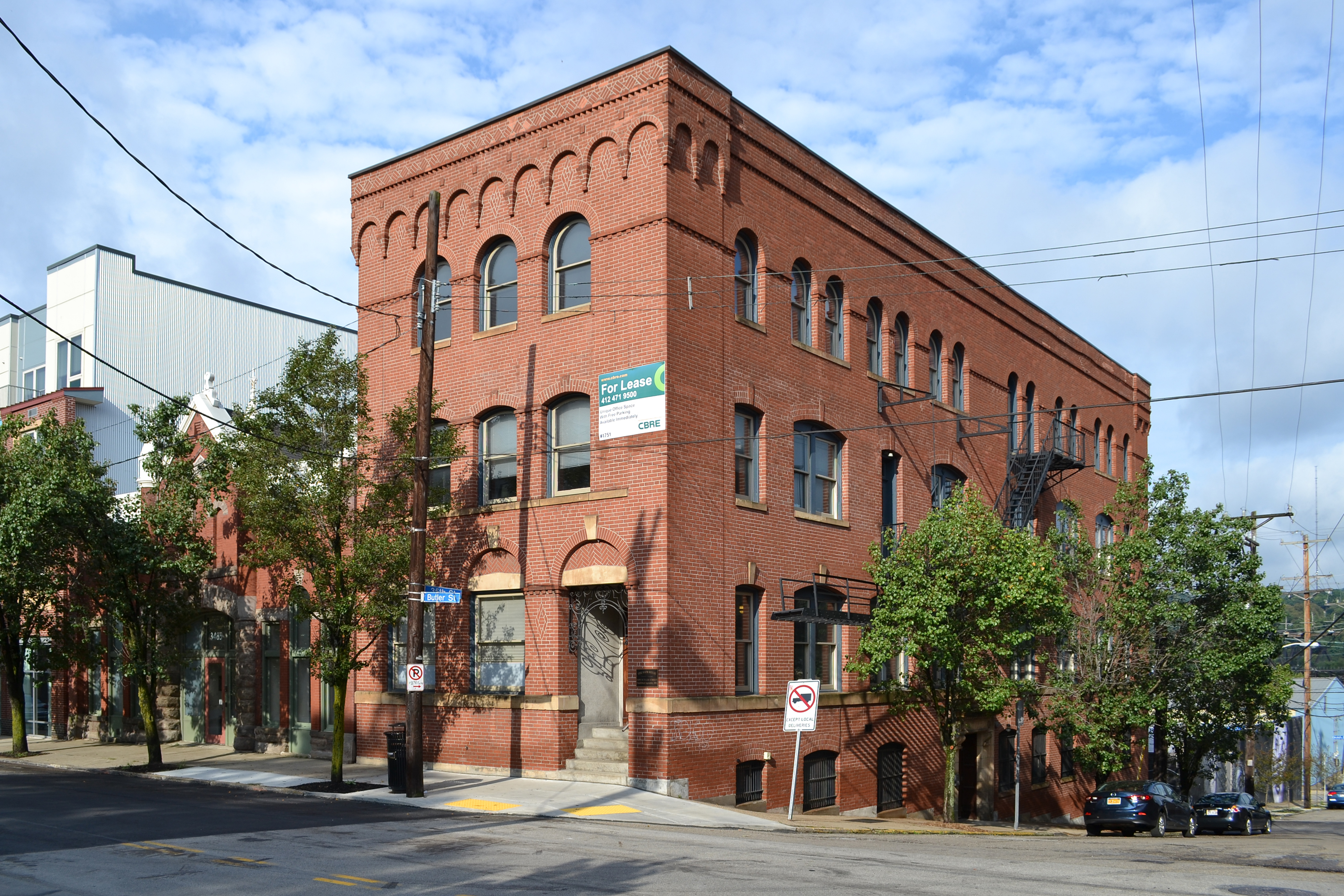
Pittsburgh Wash House and Public Baths Building, Pittsburgh, Pennsylvania, 1904.

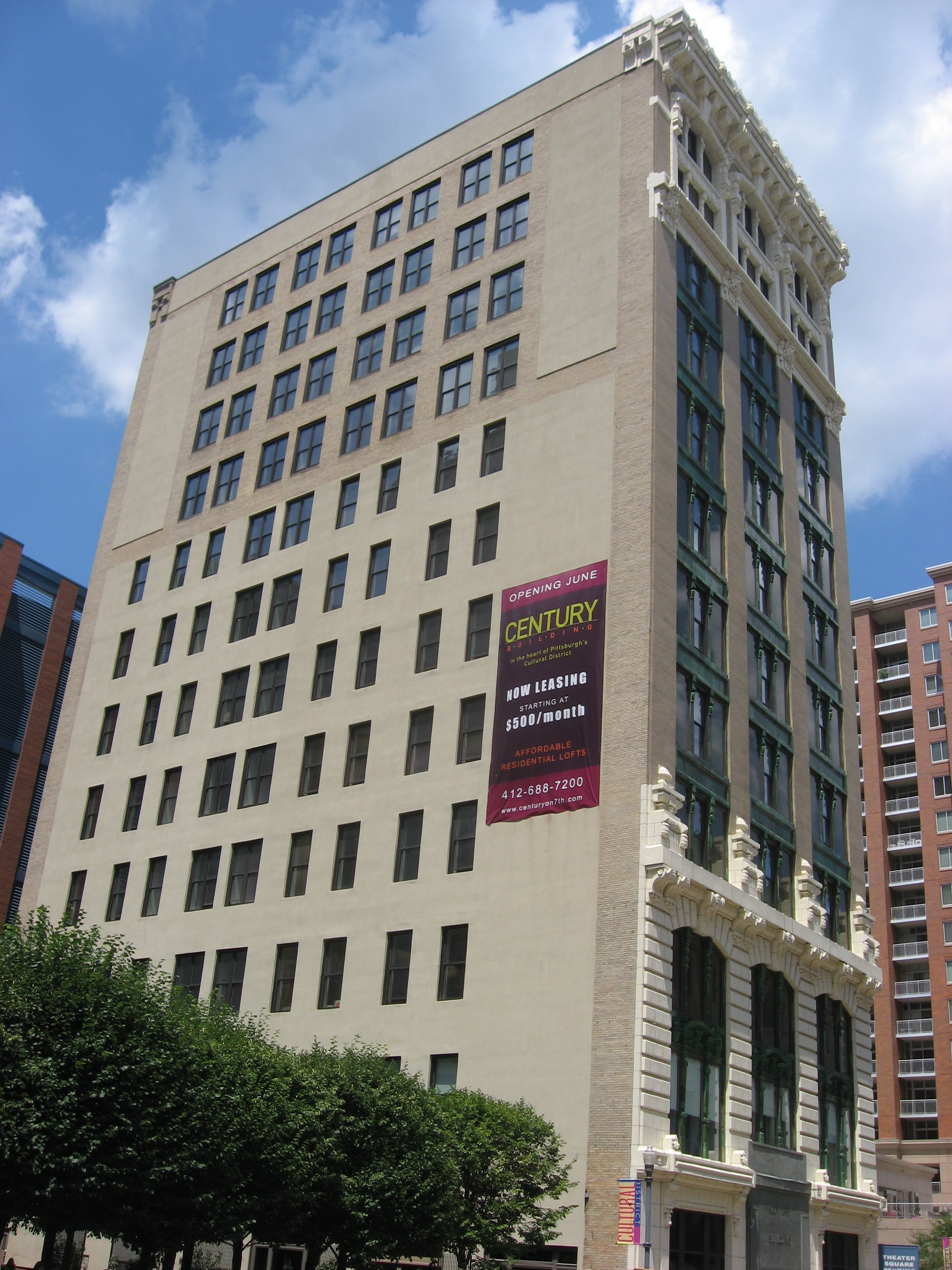
Century Building, Pittsburgh, Pennsylvania, 1906–1907.

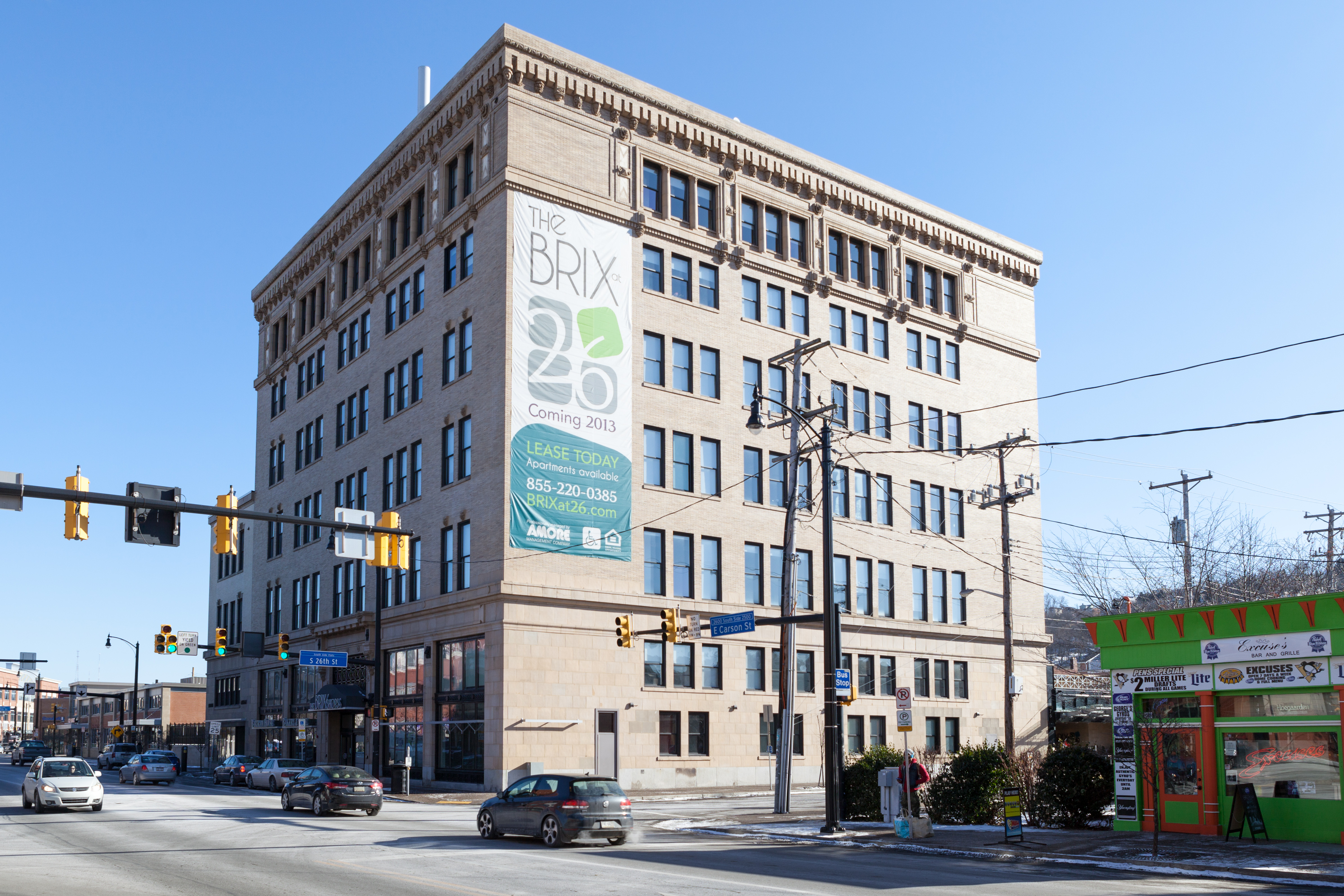
Pittsburgh Mercantile Company Building, Pittsburgh, Pennsylvania, 1907–1908.

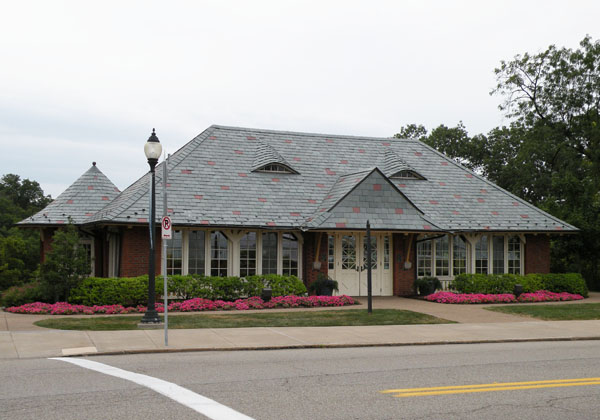
Schenley Park Café and Visitor Center, Schenley Park, Pittsburgh, Pennsylvania, 1910.
