= B. F. Jones House =

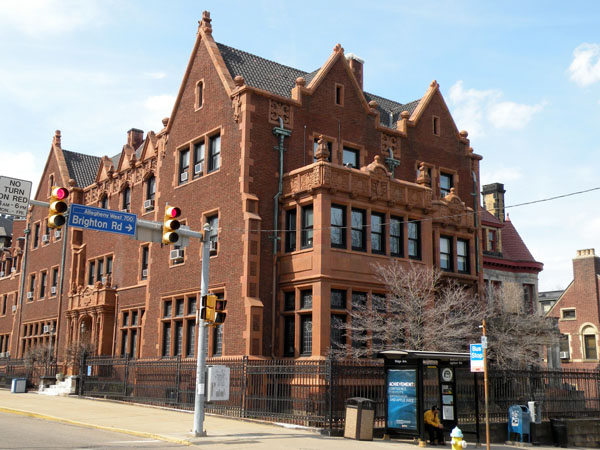

- Location within Pittsburgh
- 40°27′2.47″N 80°0′49.47″W
- Location: 808 Ridge Avenue (Allegheny West); Pittsburgh, Pennsylvania, USA

History
- Built: 1908 to 1910

Site notes
- Architect: Rutan & Russell
- Architectural style: Jacobean Revival
- Governing body: local

The B. F. Jones House at 808 Ridge Avenue in the Allegheny West neighborhood of Pittsburgh, Pennsylvania, was built from 1908 to 1910. When it was completed, it had 42 rooms and cost $375,000 to build. It was once the home of Benjamin Franklin Jones Jr., the son of Benjamin Franklin Jones, a founder of the Jones and Laughlin Steel Company. It is currently Jones Hall of the Community College of Allegheny County.

It was added to the List of City of Pittsburgh historic designations on March 15, 1974, and to the List of Pittsburgh History and Landmarks Foundation Historic Landmarks in 1970 and in 1990.
