= B.F. Jones Memorial Library =

- U.S. National Register of Historic Places
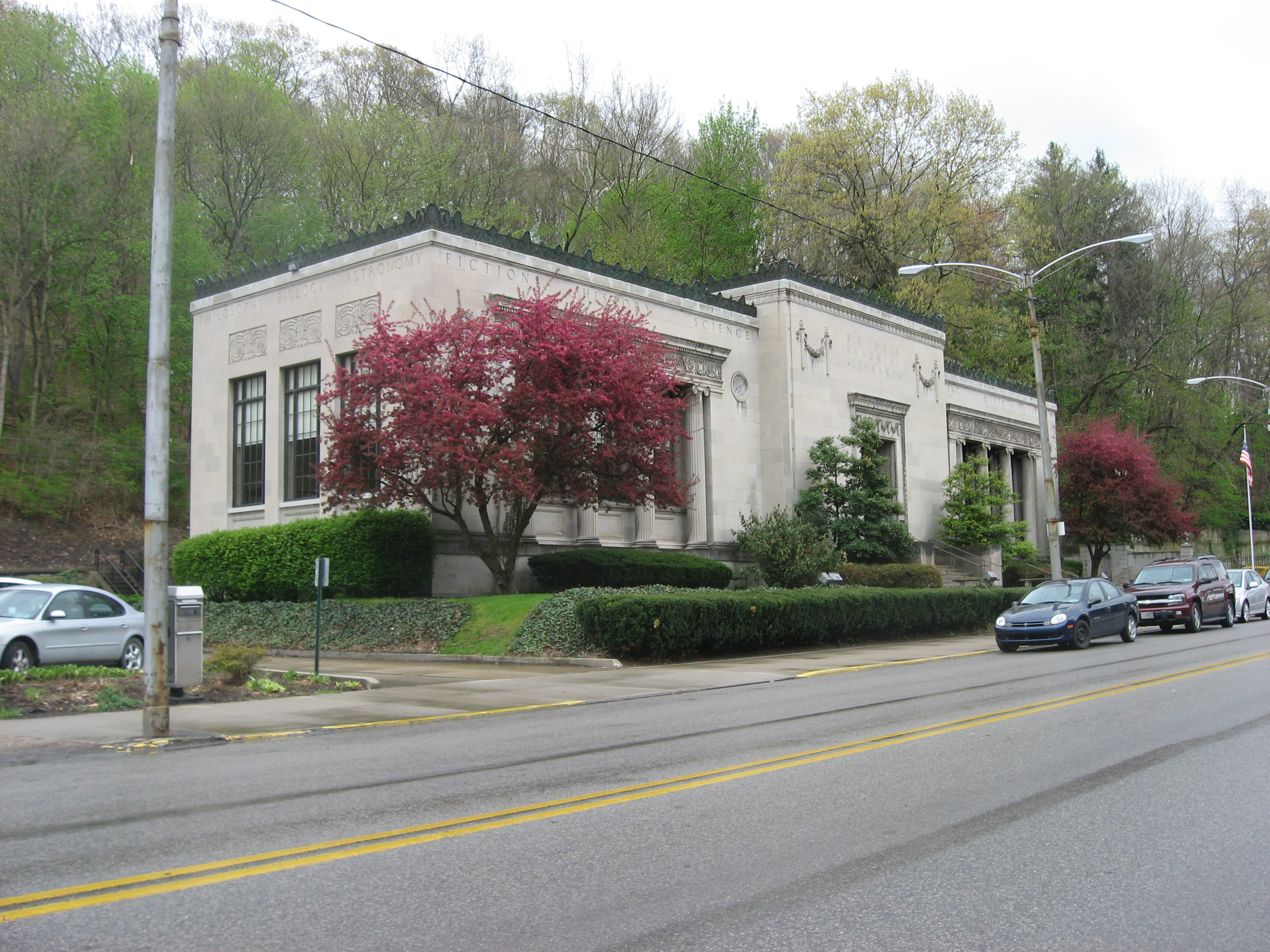
- Front of the library

- Location within Pennsylvania Location within the United States
- Location: 663 Franklin Ave., Aliquippa, Pennsylvania
- Coordinates: 40°36′47″N 80°15′5″W
- Area: 0.6 acres (0.24 ha)
- Built: 1927
- Architect: A & S Wilson Co., et al.
- Architectural style: Late 19th and 20th Century Revivals, Renaissance revival
- NRHP reference No.: 78002341
- Added to NRHP: December 15, 1978

The B.F. Jones Memorial Library is a historic library in Aliquippa, a city in Beaver County, Pennsylvania, United States. Named for steel tycoon Benjamin Franklin Jones, it was built in 1927 with money donated by Jones' daughter. As a product of the profits of the Jones and Laughlin Steel Company, for which Aliquippa was a company town, it resembled a Carnegie library.

Rated a high-quality example of small-scale Renaissance Revival architecture, the two-story library is built primarily of Indiana Limestone with a bronze roof. Among its leading features are multiple plaster casts, windows of stained glass, carvings in imitation of those made by Italian sculptor Andrea della Robbia, and a large statue of Jones.

In 1978, the library was added to the National Register of Historic Places for its architecture and for its association with Jones in the development of Aliquippa. The library continues in operation to the present day.

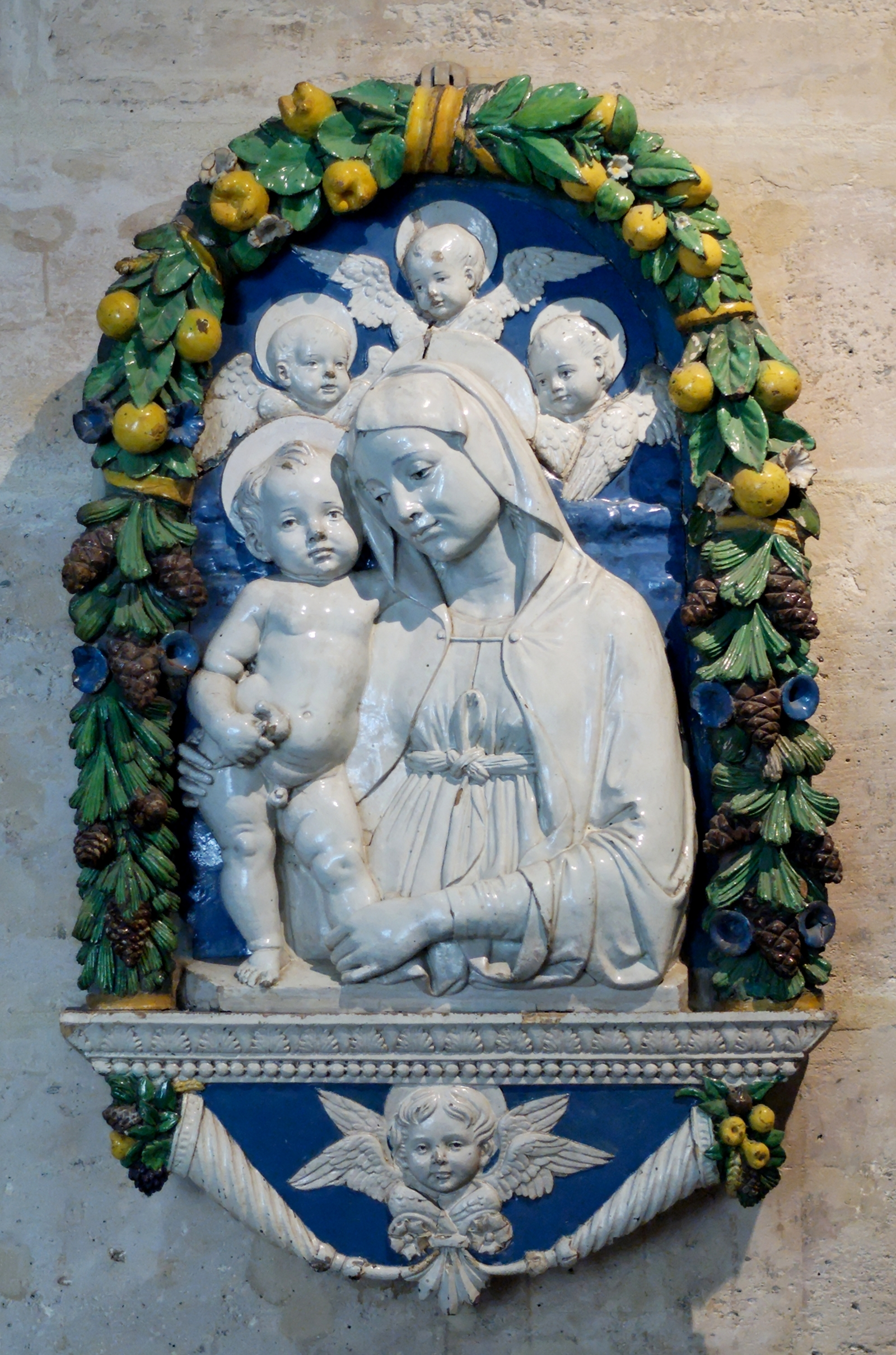
Italian original for carvings at the library
