= Bernard Lauth =

American businessman

- Born: August 23, 1820; Obersteinbach, Bas-Rhin, Grand Est, France
- Died: June 25, 1894 (aged 73) near Howard, Pennsylvania in Centre County
- Occupation: inventor
- Known for: cold rolling
- Spouse: Elizabeth Wilhelm
- Parent(s): Bernard Lauth and Catharina Barbara Dauenhauer
- Relatives: William Laud

Bernard Lauth (August 23, 1820 in Alsace, France – June 25, 1894) founded the American Iron Works in 1850 and formed a partnership with B.F. Jones in 1851. In 1854, Lauth retired from the steel firm, selling his partnership to James H. Laughlin, who led the company to be renamed Jones and Laughlin Steel Company.

== Achievements ==
He invented and patented the process for cold rolling of iron in 1859. In 1871, he purchased the iron furnace at Howard, Pennsylvania, where he built a rolling mill in 1882.
