= Benjamin Franklin Jones (industrialist) =

American industrialist (1824–1903)

Benjamin Jones
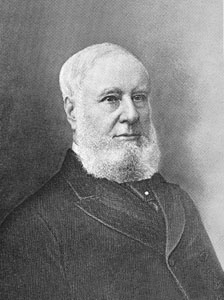

Chair of the Republican National Committee
- In office June 6, 1884 – July 12, 1888
- Preceded by: Dwight M. Sabin
- Succeeded by: Matt Quay

Personal details
- Born: Benjamin Franklin Jones, Sr. August 8, 1824 Claysville, Pennsylvania, U.S.
- Died: May 19, 1903 (aged 78) Allegheny City, Pennsylvania, U.S.
- Party: Republican
- Spouse: Mary McMasters
- Children: 1

Benjamin Franklin Jones (August 8, 1824 – May 19, 1903) was a pioneer of the iron and steel industry in Pittsburgh, United States. Originally involved in the river barge industry, he purchased a share in American Iron Works in 1851, along with Bernard Lauth. He later joined with James H. Laughlin to form Jones and Laughlin Steel Company, a steel mill heavily dependent on river transportation. The B.F. Jones Memorial Library in Aliquippa Pennsylvania, the site of J&L Steel's Aliquippa Works, was built in his honor with funds donated by his daughter.

== Biography ==
He was born on August 8, 1824, in Claysville, Pennsylvania. He married Mary McMasters and together they had a son, Benjamin Franklin Jones Jr. From 1884 to 1888 he was chairman of the Republican National Committee. He died on May 19, 1903, in Allegheny City, Pennsylvania.

== Legacy ==
He was executor of Laughlin's estate.

== Politics ==
As chairman of the Republican National Committee from 1884 to 1888, he was responsible for the James G. Blaine presidential campaign during the 1884 United States presidential election, in which Blaine was defeated by Grover Cleveland.

== See also ==
- Benjamin Franklin Jones Cottage
- B. F. Jones House

Party political offices
Preceded by Dwight M. Sabin	Chair of the Republican National Committee; 1884–1888	Succeeded by Matt Quay
