= James Laughlin (industrialist) =

American businessman (1806-1822)

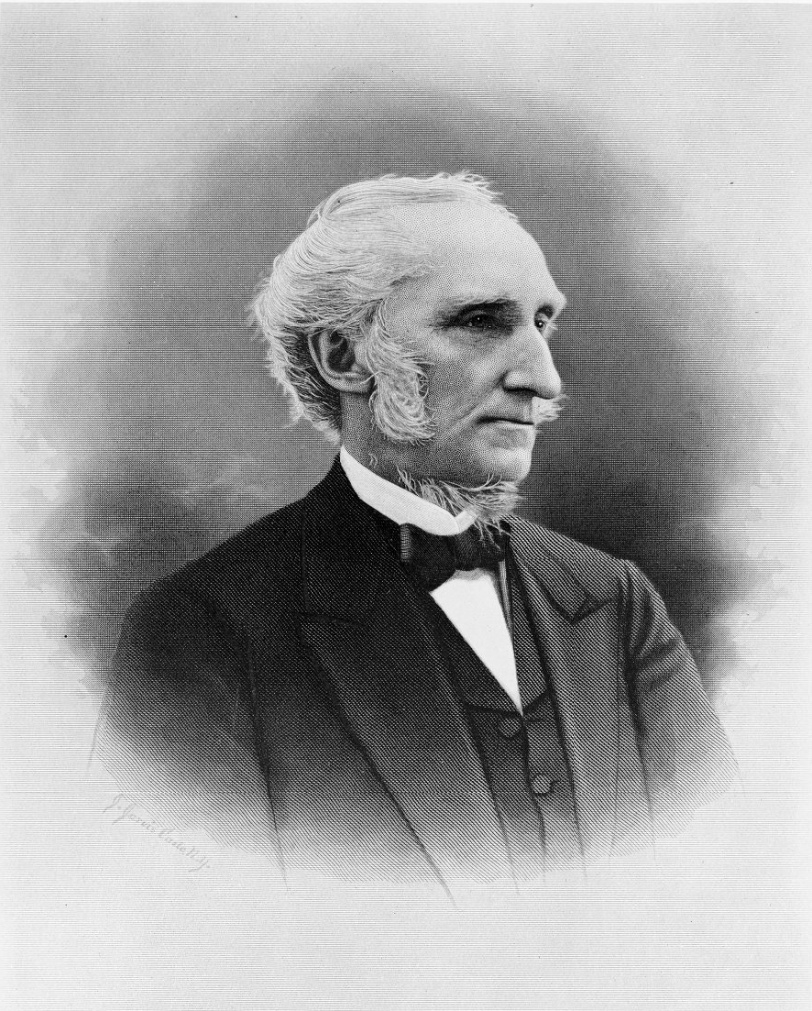
- Born: March 1, 1806; County Down, Ireland
- Died: December 18, 1882 (aged 76); Pittsburgh, Pennsylvania, US
- Occupation: Financier
- Known for: Jones and Laughlin Steel
- Spouse: Ann Irwin (m. 1837; died 1882)
- Children: Henry Alexander Laughlin; Irwin Boyle Laughlin; George McCully Laughlin; Eliza Irwin Phillips; James Laughlin
- Parent(s): James Laughlin; Eliza Boyd
- Relatives: Irwin B. Laughlin (grandson); Duncan Phillips (grandson); James Laughlin IV (great-grandson)

James H. Laughlin (March 1, 1806 – December 18, 1882) was an Irish-American banker and capitalist, a pioneer of the iron and steel industry in Pittsburgh, Pennsylvania.

== Early life ==
He was born near Portaferry in County Down, Ireland, the son of Jane (née Boyd) Laughlin (1763–1814) and James Laughlin, Sr. (1748–1831). Among his siblings was brother Alexander Laughlin, whose son, Alexander J. Laughlin married Mary Franklin Jones (a daughter of his business partner Benjamin Franklin Jones).

He was educated at Belfast, and after leaving school he assisted his father in taking care of his estate until age twenty, when his mother died in 1814 and the family came to America. Upon his arrival he entered into partnership with his brother Alexander.

== Career ==
In 1854, Laughlin bought the retiring Bernard Lauth's interest in the steel partnership with Benjamin Franklin Jones. The company was renamed Jones and Laughlin in 1861, later reorganized as J&L Steel.

In 1844, Laughlin was appointed as a corporator to the board responsible for establishing the Allegheny Cemetery. In 1852, Laughlin and his associates, including B.F. Jones, founded a banking organization that, when chartered, was the First National Bank of Pittsburgh, later Pittsburgh National Bank.

Laughlin was the first president of the Western Theological Seminary in Pittsburgh.

He was a founder of the Pennsylvania Female College, which later became Chatham University.

== Personal life ==
In 1837, Laughlin was married to Ann McCully Irwin (1813–1891), a daughter of Boyle Irwin and Eliza (née McCully) Irwin. Together, they were the parents of:

- Henry Alexander Laughlin (1838–1922), who married Alice B. Denniston in 1860. After her death in 1873, he married Mary B. Reed, a daughter of Colin McFarquhar Reed, in 1876.
- Irwin Boyle Laughlin (1840–1871), who married Mary Wood Bissell, a daughter of John Bissell, in 1870.
- George McCully Laughlin (1842–1908), who married Isabel Bowman McKennan, a daughter of Judge William McKennan of the Third Circuit Court of Appeals, in 1865.
- Elizabeth "Eliza" Irwin Laughlin (1844–1929), who married Duncan Clinch Phillips, a Pittsburgh window glass millionaire, in 1883.
- James Laughlin (1847–1919), who married Sidney Ford Page, the youngest child of John Harding Page.

American poet and literary book publisher James Laughlin IV is descended from Laughlin.

Laughlin died at his home in Pittsburgh on December 18, 1882.
