= Cottesmore Hall =

House in Cobourg, Ontario

Coordinates: 43.964539°N 78.151497°W

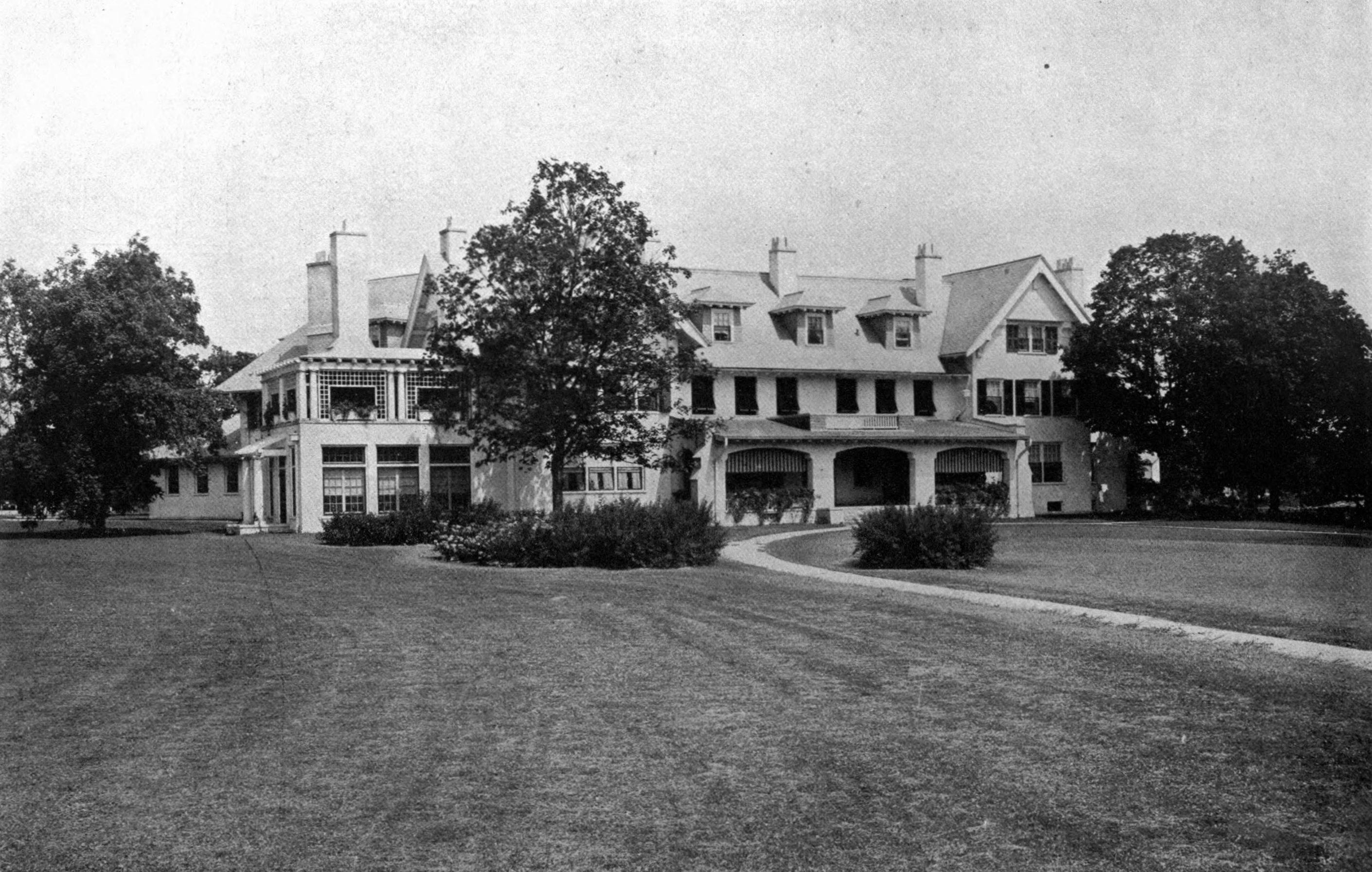

General information
- Location: Cobourg, Ontario
- Year built: 1908–1910
- Demolished: 1974
- Owner: Wallace H. Rowe

Design and construction
- Architecture firm: Rutan & Russell
- Other designers: Frederick Todd

Cottesmore Hall was a mansion in Coubourg, Ontario. The house was completed in 1910 as a summer home for Wallace Hurtte Rowe (1861–1919), the founder and president of the Pittsburgh Steel Company. Cottesmore Hall was one of several mansions built in Cobourg by wealthy American families, who in the late 19th and early 20th centuries made the town a summer colony. Rowe hired Pittsburgh architects Rutan & Russell, who designed a Colonial Revival house clad in white stucco. The Rowe family owned the home until 1949, when the property was expropriated by the Government of Ontario for use as a home for wayward girls. The house was demolished in 1974.

== History ==
=== Cobourg as a summer colony ===
Cobourg emerged as a wealthy summer colony through the growth of its transportation infrastructure and because of resource development in Northumberland County. In the 1830s, the harbour of Cobourg was refurbished, and the following decade, a daily ferry was established between Cobourg and Rochester, New York. In 1854, the Cobourg and Peterborough Railway opened, and two years later, the Grand Trunk Railway opened, with a stop in Cobourg.

Prior to the American Civil War, iron deposits had been discovered in Northumberland Country at Marmora and Blairton. In the late 1860s, Pennsylvania businessmen George K. Shoenberger and William Chambliss acquired control of the mine at Marmora and of the C&P Railway, and merged the operations to form the Cobourg, Peterborough, and Mamora Railway and Mining Company. Shoenberger, Chambliss, and their associates visited Ontario periodically and worked from Cobourg. Over time, they began bringing family and friends with them on their trips. In 1873, Schoenberger and Chambliss built the Arlington Hotel in Cobourg as a base for the group of Americans who had begun spending time in Cobourg.

=== The Hall ===
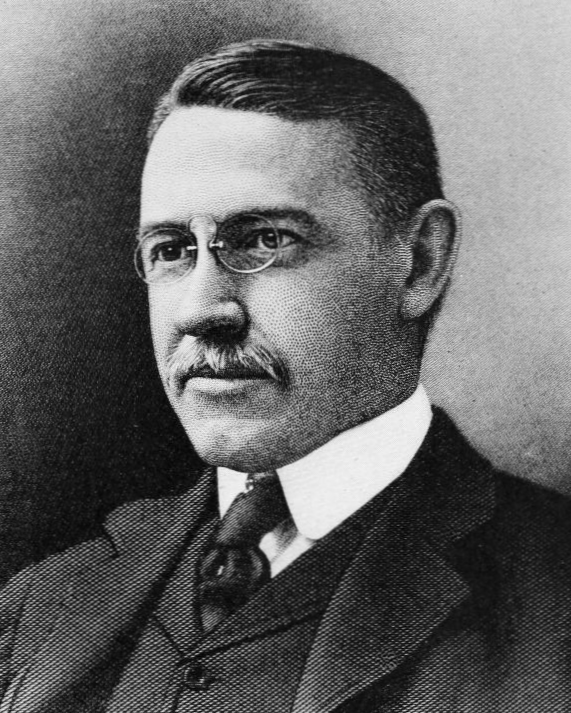
Wallace Hurtte Rowe (1861–1919)

Wallace Rowe purchased his property in Cobourg in 1904. He acquired the property from Vincent Howard, a Methodist minister whose wife was a descendant of Benedict Arnold. The name "Cottesmore Hall" came from Cottesmore Avenue, while the name of the road itself came from a home occupied by William Weller, which sat approximately where the Cottesmore Hall stables were built. Rowe hired as architects Rutan & Russell of Pittsburgh and began construction in 1908.

Rowe's estate was bounded on the east by a creek that flows into Lake Ontario, and on the west by Cottesmore Avenue. The house was designed specifically to be fireproof; walls were built of brick and tile with floors of hollow tile and reinforced concrete. The exterior was clad in cream-white concrete stucco with a pebble dash surface. Interior walls were of cream-white painted wood with mahogany base boards and window sills. The roof was made of tile. The sunroom included a beam ceiling made from Southern Georgia pine and a stone fireplace. Meanwhile, the den was given a Tyrolean treatment with wainscoted walls and an angled ceiling with rough-hewn decorative beams.

The iron gates on King Street were made by the Canada Foundry Company and cost several thousand dollars. Landscape architect for the project was Frederick Todd of Montreal. The gates opened onto a Telford road lined with large maples. Other paths on the property were of the Macadam type on ten inches of crushed stone. The formal garden on the property was laid out in a double Maltese cross pattern bordered by perennials. The bulk of perennials were roses provided by Sam McGredy of Portadown, County Armagh. Among the roses found on the estate were King George V, Mrs Maynard Sinton, Mrs Muir MacKenna, Général Jacqueminot, Madame Abel Chatenay, Étoile de France, Mrs Wallace H. Rowe, Kaiserin Auguste Viktoria, Mrs John Laing, Liberty, and Frau Karl Druschki. The property included three outbuildings: a combined stable and garage, a poultry house, and a tool shed. Today, the garage and poultry house are the only surviving parts of the estate. A clay tennis court was built on what was formerly the upper part of the vegetable garden. This court was enclosed by a cedar hedge surrounded by lilacs, high bush cranberries, and bush honeysuckles.

After building the house, Wallace Rowe became an important member of the community in Cobourg. He gave generously to St Andrew's Presbyterian Church, founded the local golf club, and provided the hospital its first X-ray equipment.

=== Expropriation ===
In 1947, George Harrison Dunbar, the minister for reform institutions, proposed to the minister of public works, George Doucett, to acquire the property for use as a home for wayward girls, which he claimed was needed urgently. The government had acquired Bagnall Hall (of Willis McCook), the estate to the west of Cottesmore in 1940, and Strathmore (of George M. Clarke), the estate to the east of Cottesmore in 1945.

That year, the Ontario government approached Mrs Rowe with a request to purchase the estate. Mrs Rowe declined, and the government assured her it would not pursue expropriation. Then, in 1948, the government told her she would have to sell, and in response, she asked to keep the property until her death. Finally, on 22 December 1948, the government took expropriation action. The government paid $43,000 for the property and Mrs Rowe was given six months to vacate the house. However, the following year, Dunbar's successor, William Ernest Hamilton, decided the property was unsuitable for this function due to its proximity to a major highway. Instead, the government proposed to turn it into a hospital for aged mental patients. Although the Rowes did not appeal, the family was angry over the affair. One family member said, "what a way to treat a fine American family after 42 years' summer residence in Canada. We cry for U.S. tourists – we get the very best – and we throw them out to make way for a home for wayward girls which has not even yet been occupied."

== Gallery ==
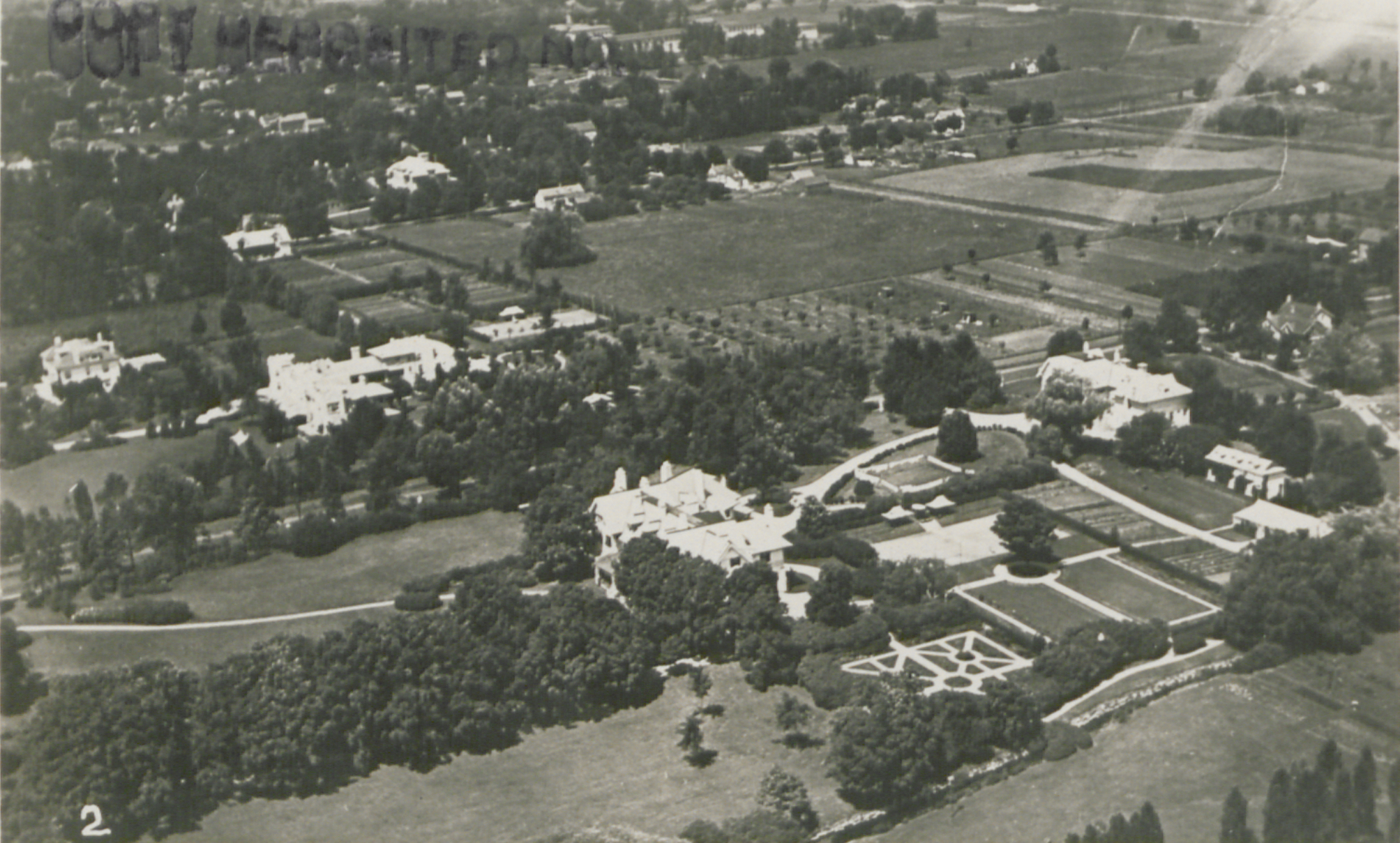
Aerial of the estate

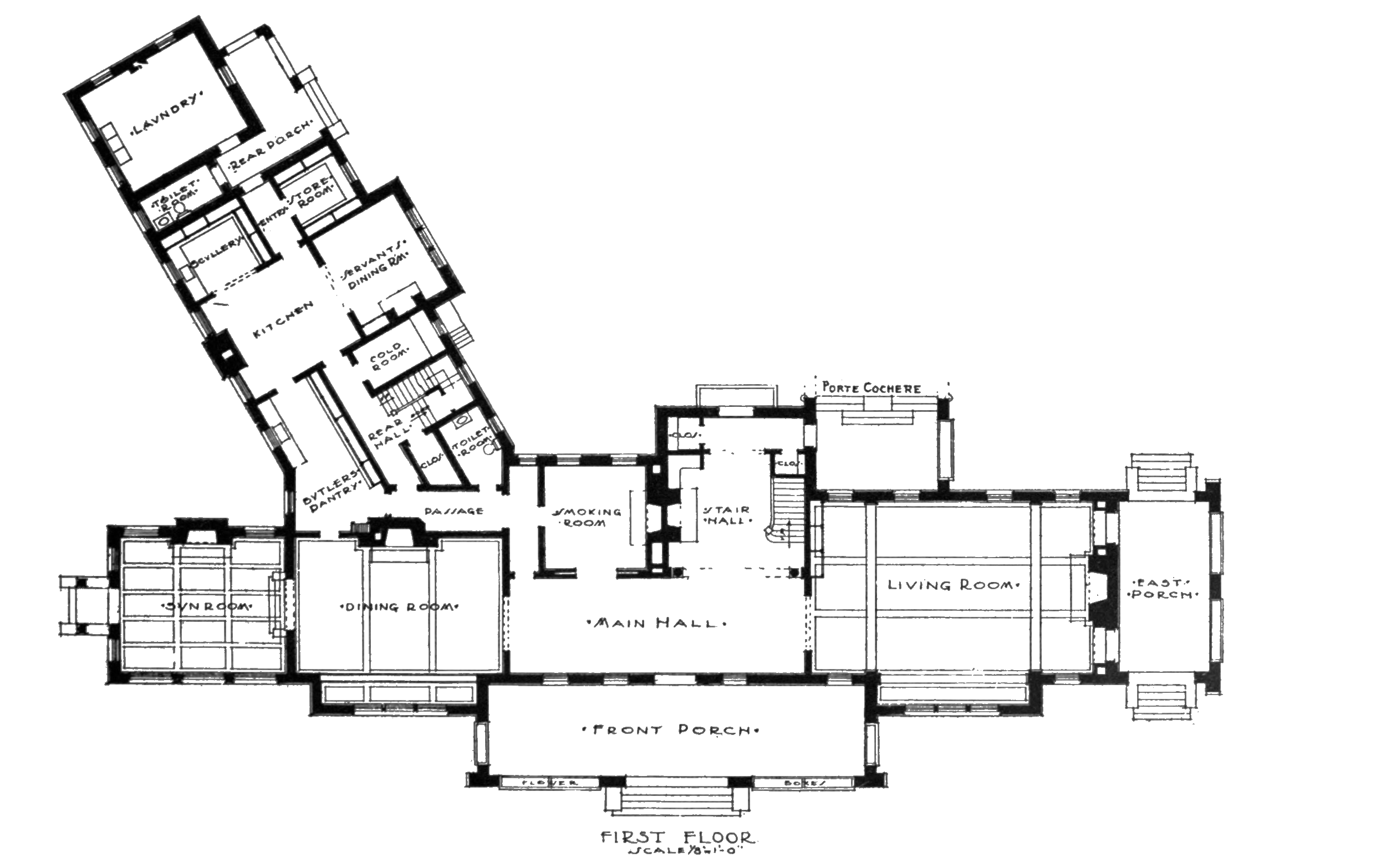
Main floor plan

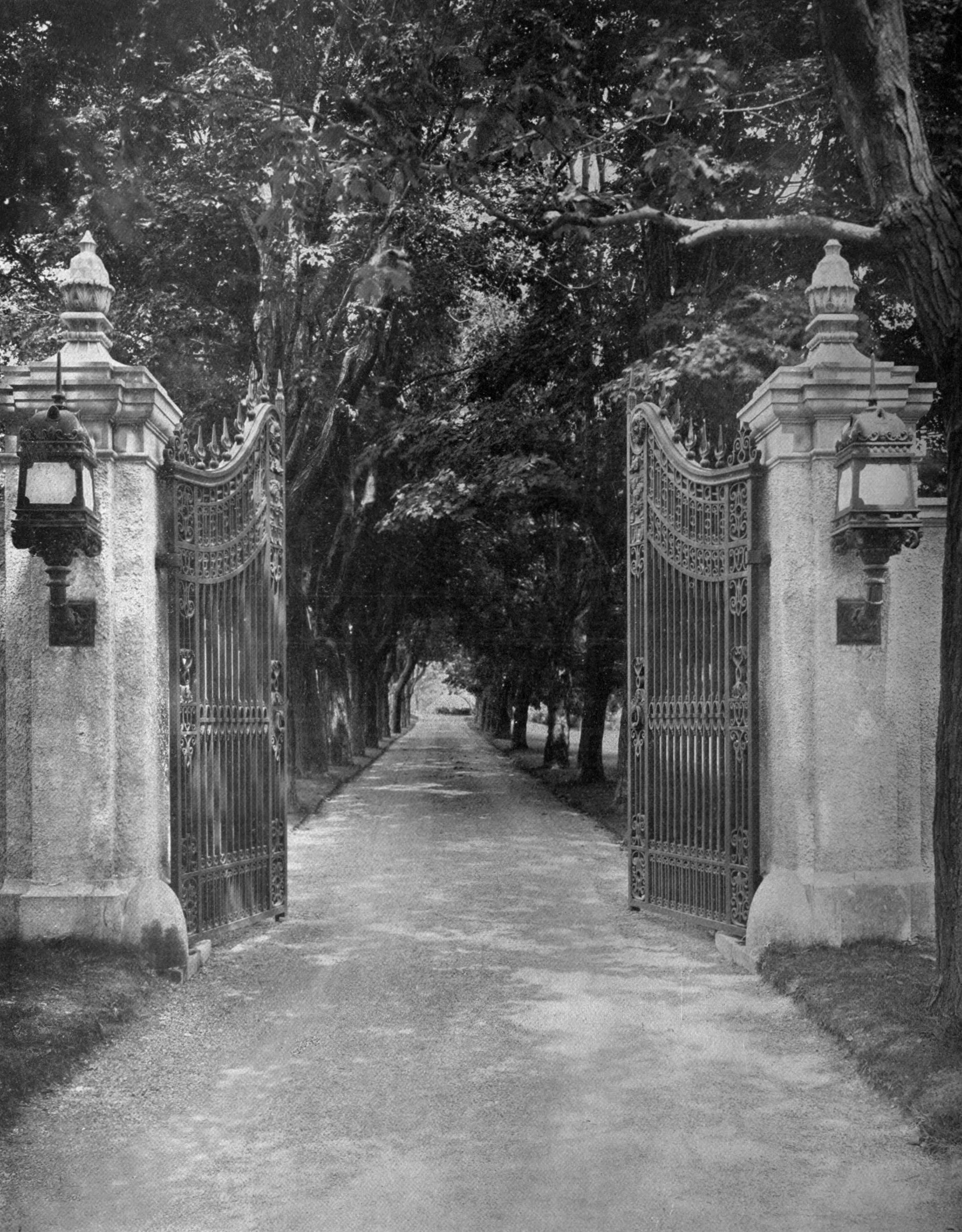
Entrance gate

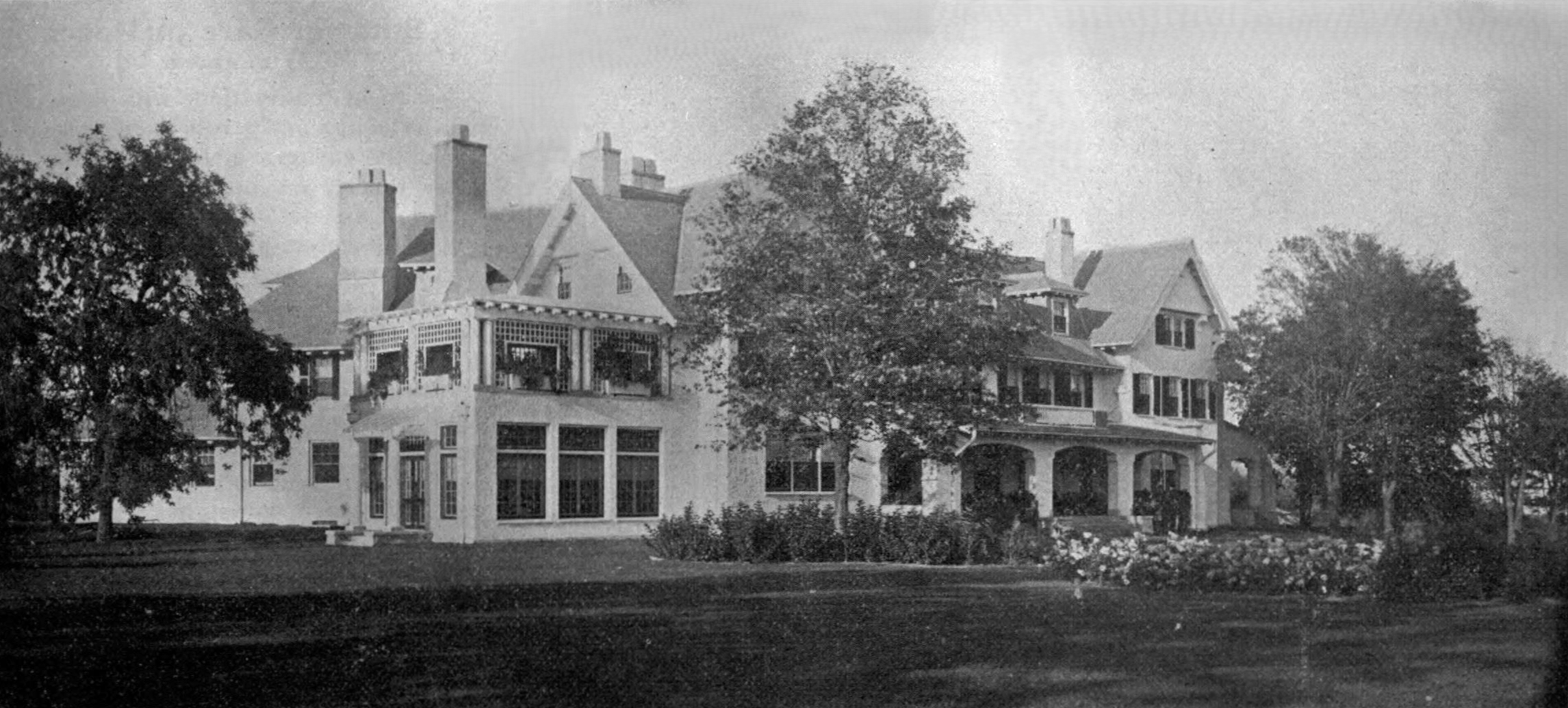
Front of the house

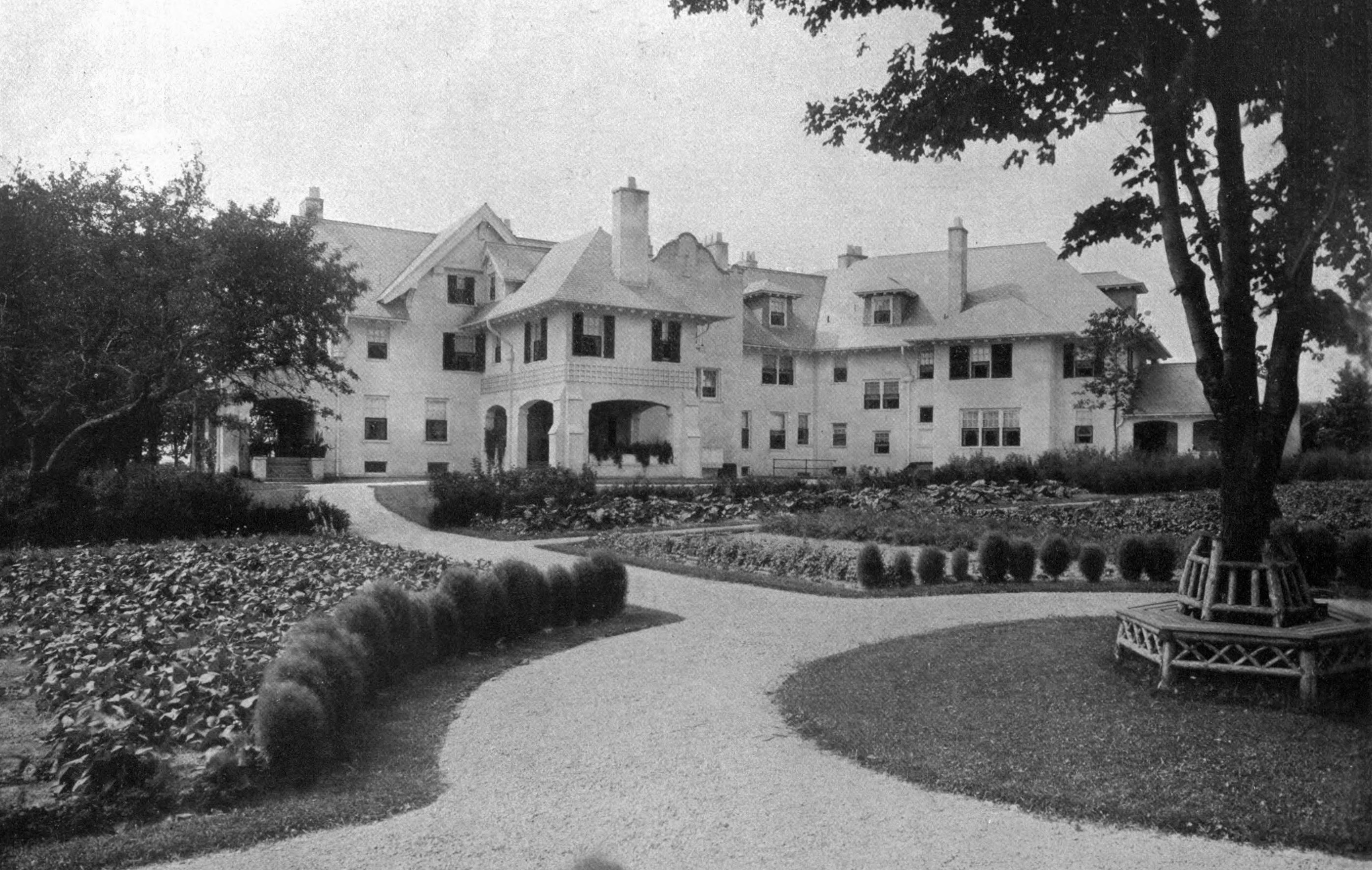
Rear of the house

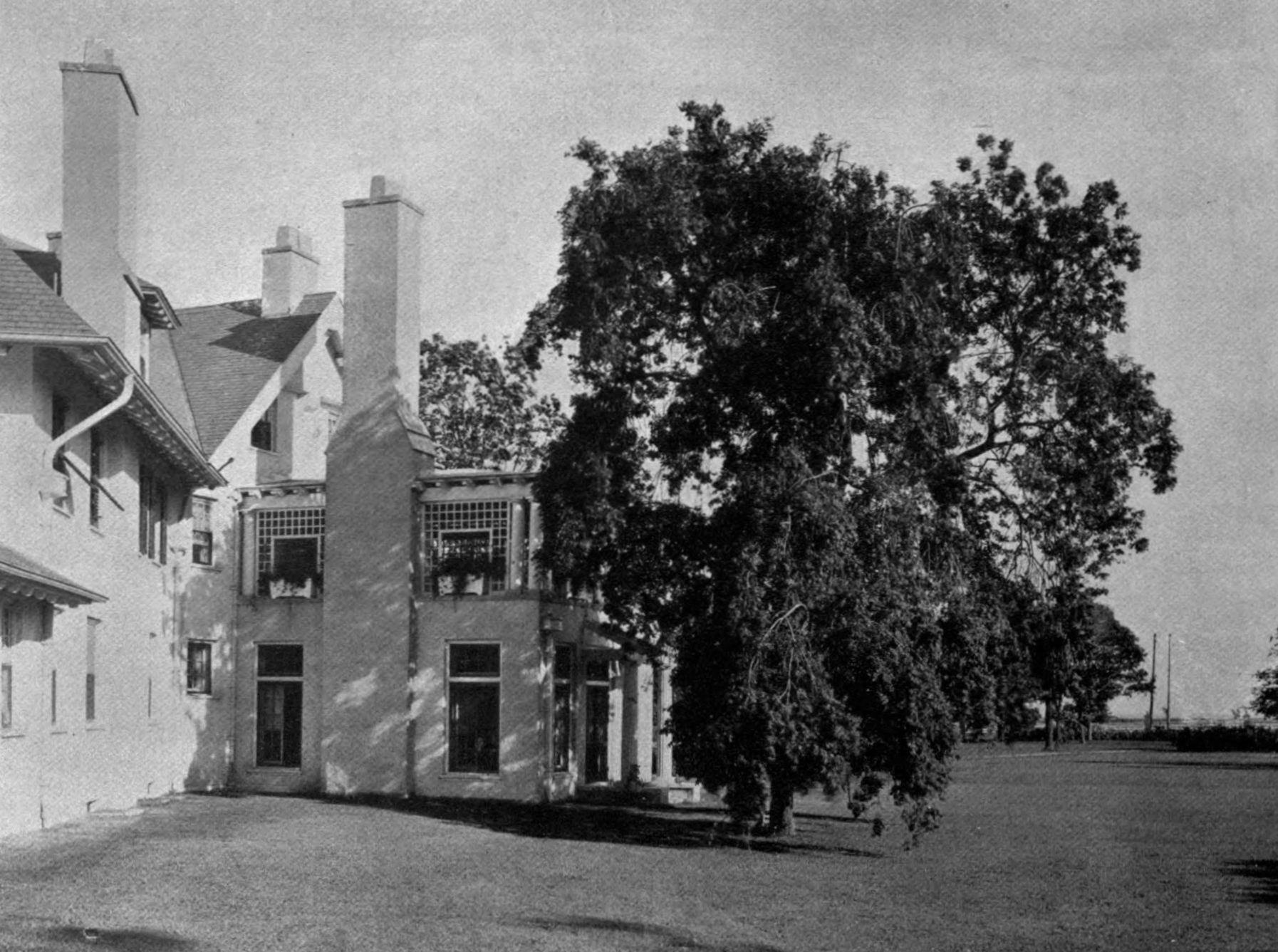
Sun room

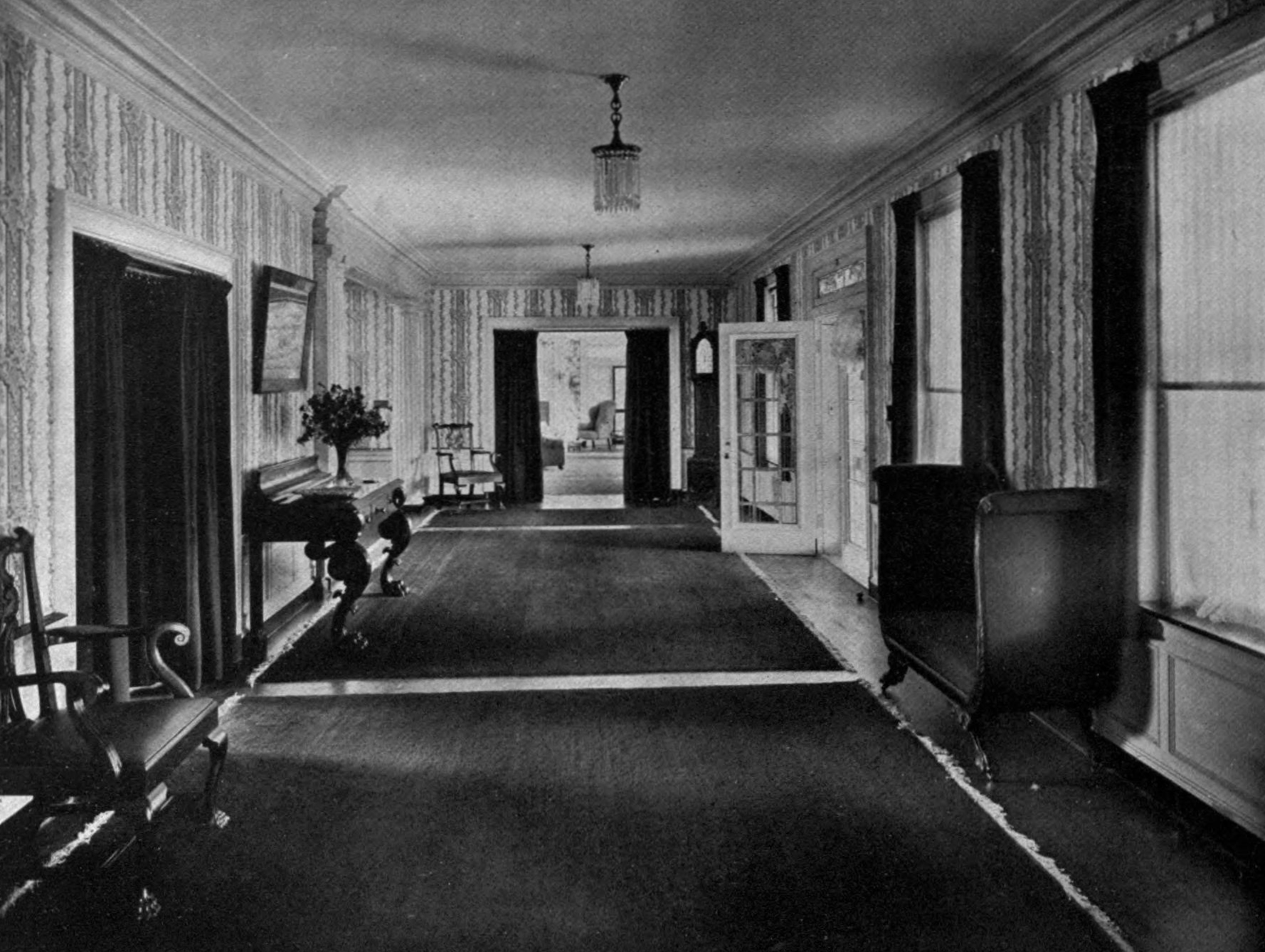
Main hall

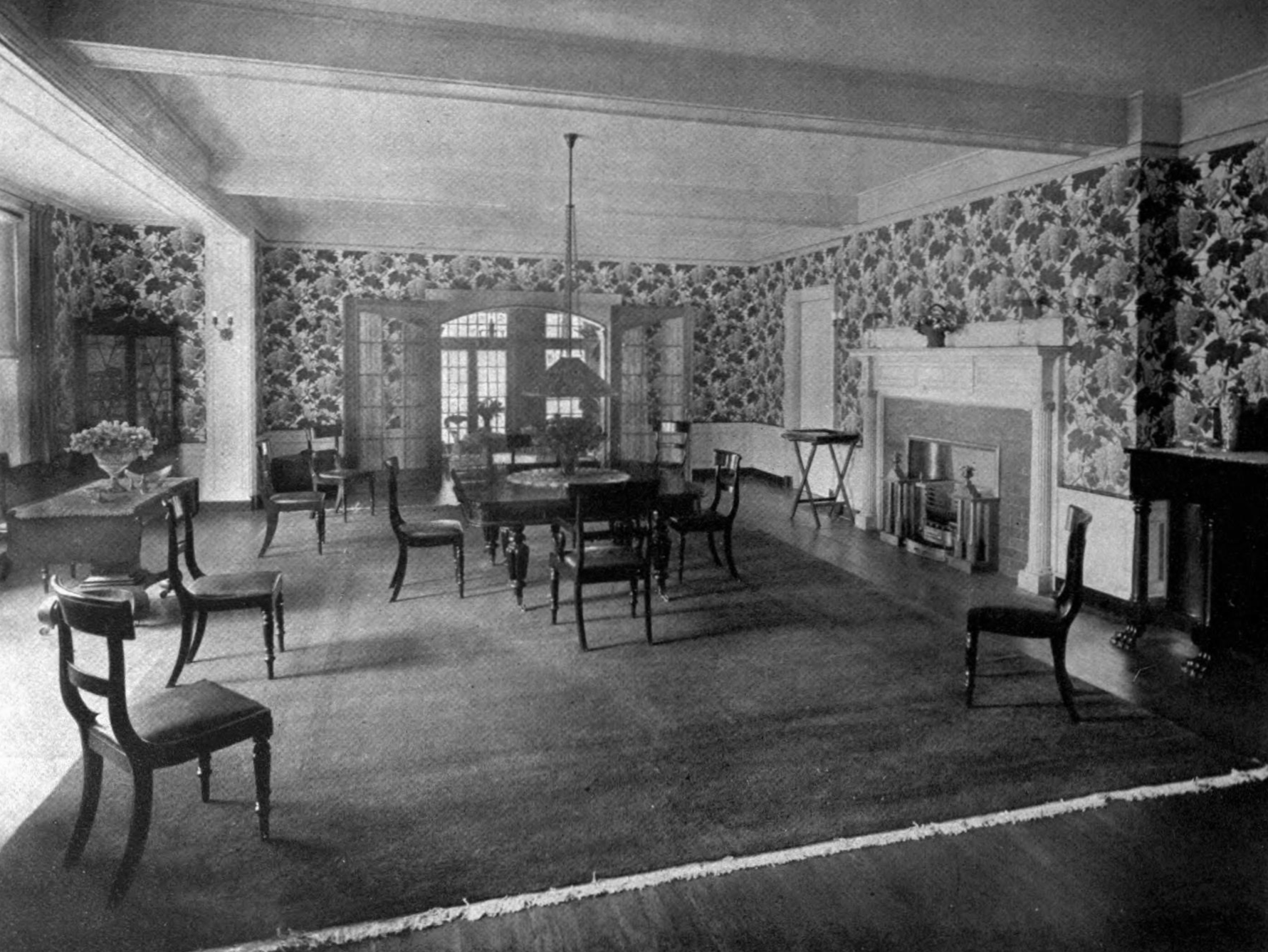
Dining room

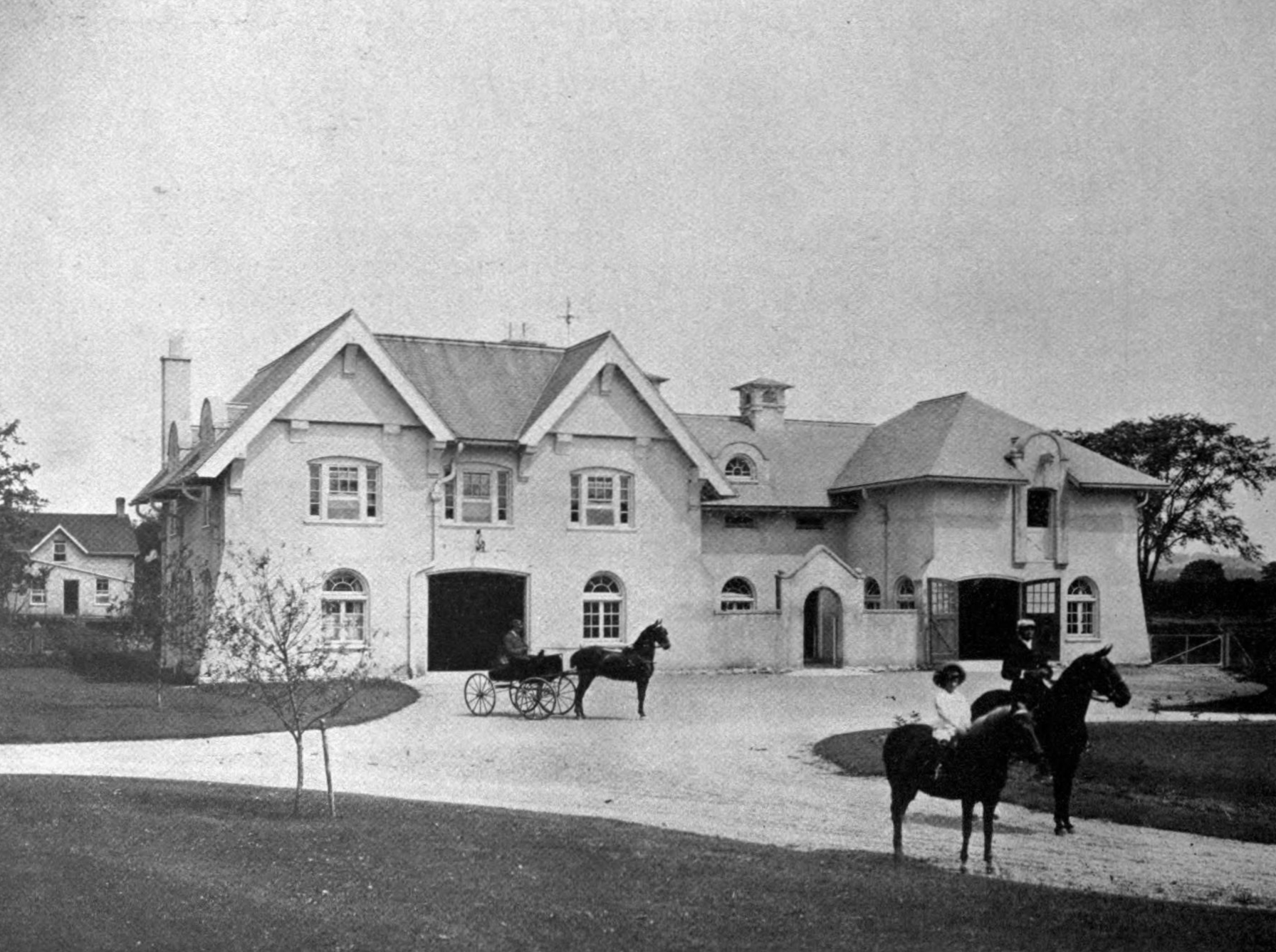
The stables and garage, which survives

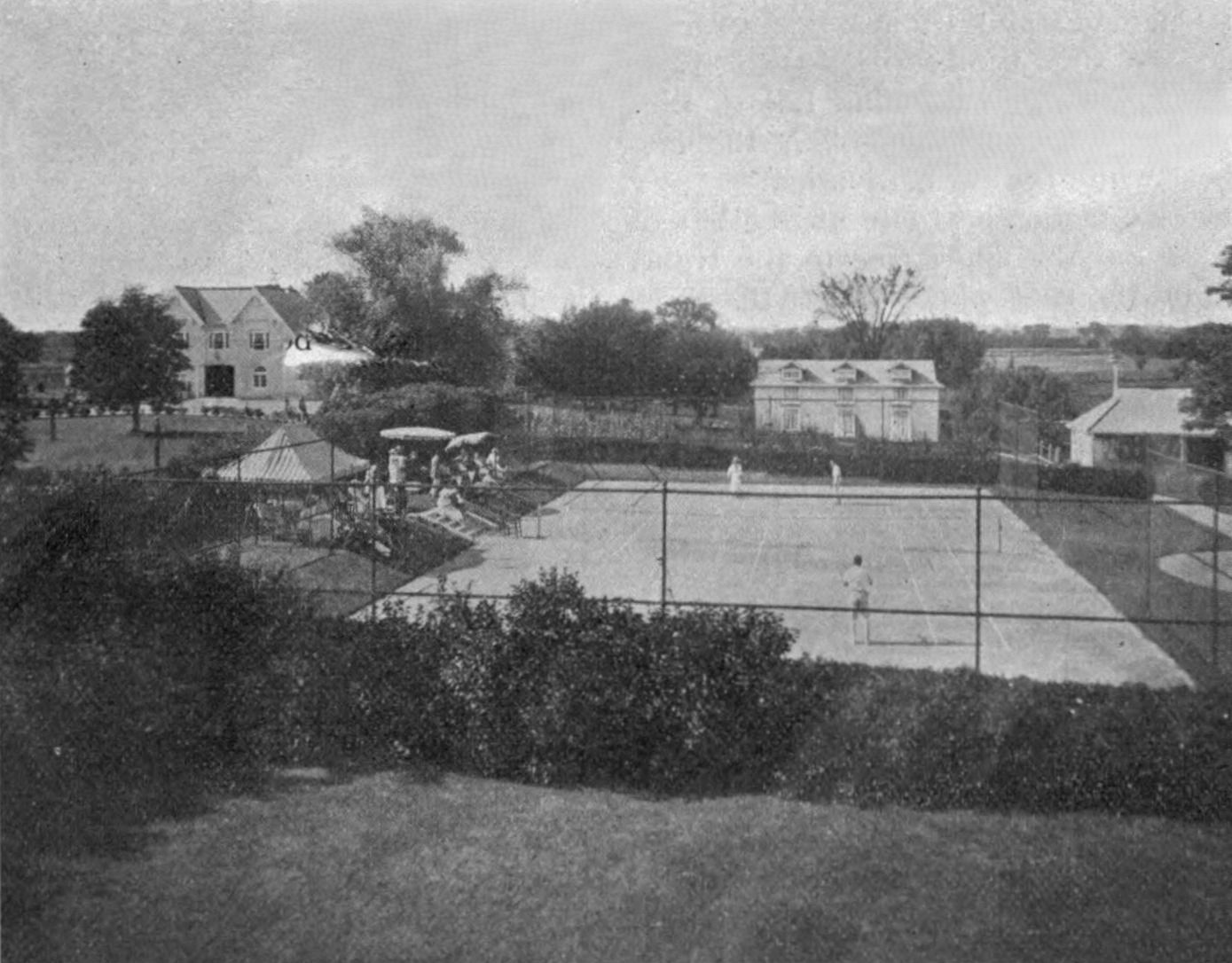
Clay tennis court

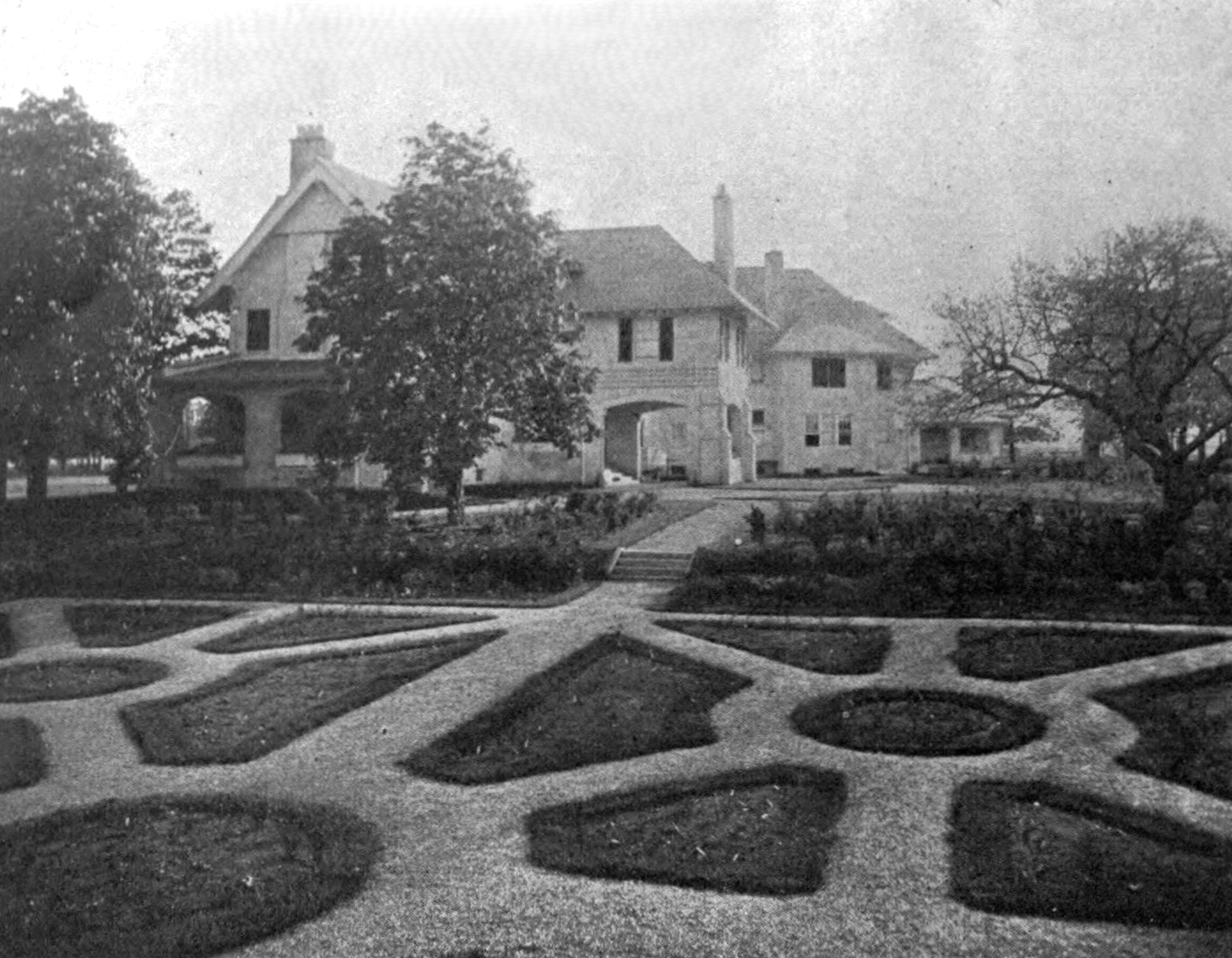
Formal garden

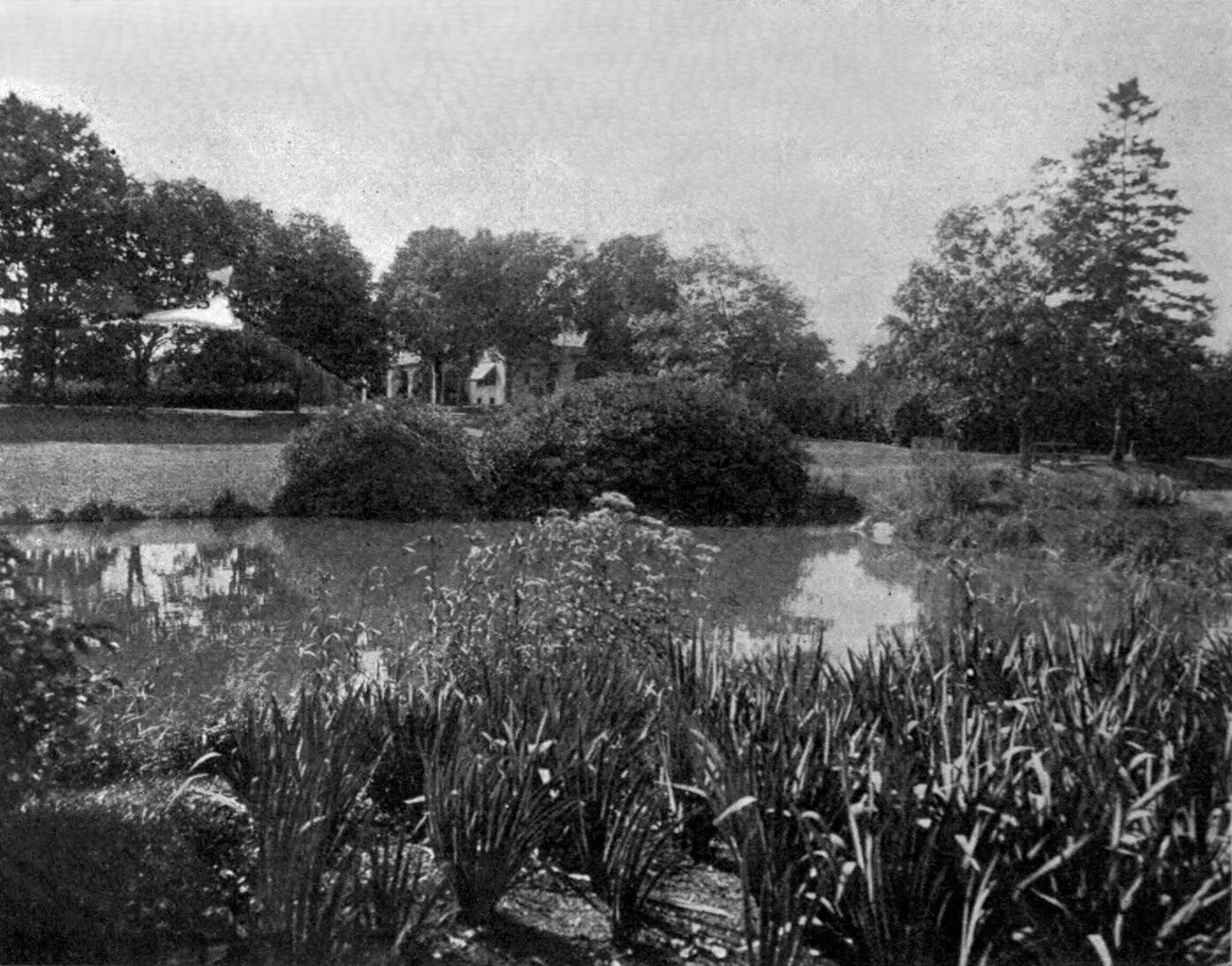
Artificial pond
