= Former Pittsburgh Wash House and Public Baths Building =

- Pittsburgh Wash House and Public Baths Building
- U.S. Historic district – Contributing property
- Pittsburgh Historic Designation
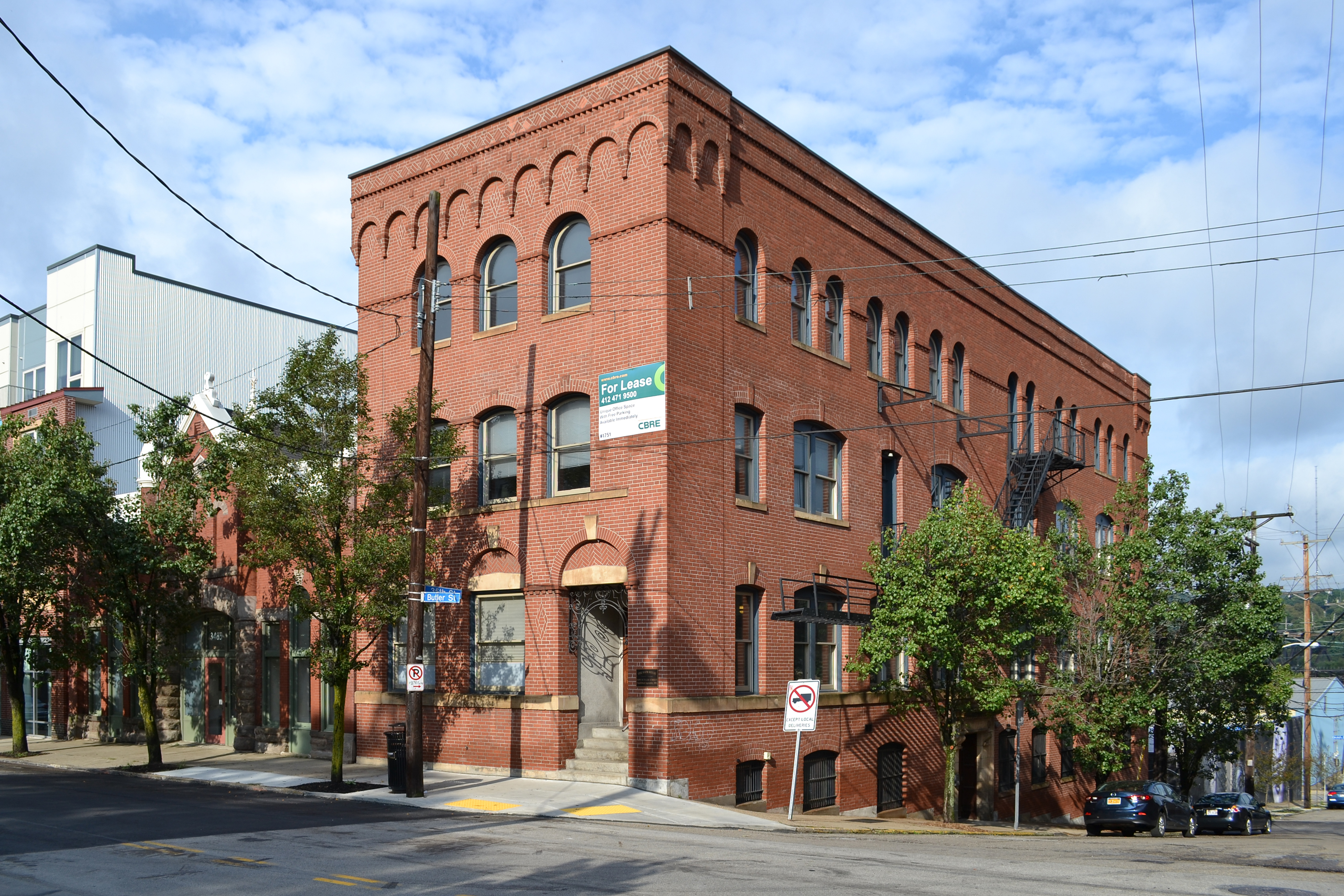
- The building in 2019

- Location within Pittsburgh
- Location: 3495 Butler St., Pittsburgh, Pennsylvania
- Coordinates: 40°27′50.28″N 79°58′0.04″W
- Built: 1904
- Architect: Rutan & Russell
- Architectural style: Romanesque Revival
- Part of: Lawrenceville Historic District (ID100004020)

Significant dates
- Designated CP: July 8, 2019
- Designated CPHD: July 12, 2018

The Former Pittsburgh Wash House and Public Baths Building is located at 3495 Butler Street in the Lawrenceville neighborhood of Pittsburgh, Pennsylvania. Built in 1904 in the Romanesque Revival architectural style, the building today serves as office space. The bath house was designated a Pittsburgh historic landmark in 2018 and was listed as a contributing property in the Lawrenceville Historic District in 2019.

== History ==
The original idea for the bath house came from the Clothing and House Furnishing Bureau. The group was organized by parishioners from local churches, including St. James Episcopal Church, in 1895. The organization spent the first years of its life providing working-class families with clothing at fair prices. They soon realized that since several families often lived in single-family homes, that this meant that regular and proper bathing was hard to come by. This encouraged the group to purchase land for a bath house in 1901, and construction began in April 1903. Two prominent philanthropists, Henry W. Phipps Jr. and George Westinghouse, helped make the building's existence possible. Phipps grew up in Allegheny City, now Pittsburgh's North Side, and was a neighbor of Andrew Carnegie. Phipps worked as a business partner with Carnegie, and when Carnegie Steel Company was sold, Phipps began making philanthropic donations, although he did not publicize this. One of these donations was to the Pittsburgh Wash House. Phipps initially offered the group constructing the bath house $1,000, but after investigating further and becoming more interested, he offered to fund half of the cost of the building, and half of the first year's expenses. Westinghouse was generally against philanthropy as he believed it wasn’t beneficial to the giver or the receiver. Nonetheless, he donated the electric generator and other related equipment which allowed the bath house to also operate a laundry facility. After funding for the project was secured, the Building and Advisory Committees chose the architectural firm Rutan & Russell to design the building. Construction of the building finished the next year, with the public opening held on June 1, 1904, making it the third public wash house in the United States. The building was unique among bath houses, because in addition to offering bathing facilities for men and women, it also offered a means to wash ones clothes, and a clothing exchange and sewing facility. The building also included an assembly room, men's clubrooms, and a day kindergarten. After World War I the number of patrons dropped and by 1928 the bath house had to ask the city council for $2,000 for repairs. In 1929 nearly 1,500,000 baths had been taken in the house, and many others had used the building for other purposes. By the 1950s use started to slow as the Pittsburgh City Council made indoor plumbing and bathing facilities mandatory in every house, and the bath house closed for good on December 7, 1961. Since then the building has been vacant at times and occupied by several different businesses at others. In 2001 it was renovated to house office spaces. The building was nominated in January 2018 to become a City Historic Landmark by Preservation Pittsburgh.

== Architecture ==
The building was designed by architectural firm Rutan & Russell in the Romanesque Revival style. Elements of this style can be seen with the buildings massing, springing arches, as well as the recessed entrance. Rutan & Russell were later recognized for their work contributing to the continuation of this particular style in Pittsburgh. The construction for the building was done by George A. Cochrane, and the plumbing by McFadden & Craig, both of whom had worked on numerous buildings in Pittsburgh previously.

== Gallery ==
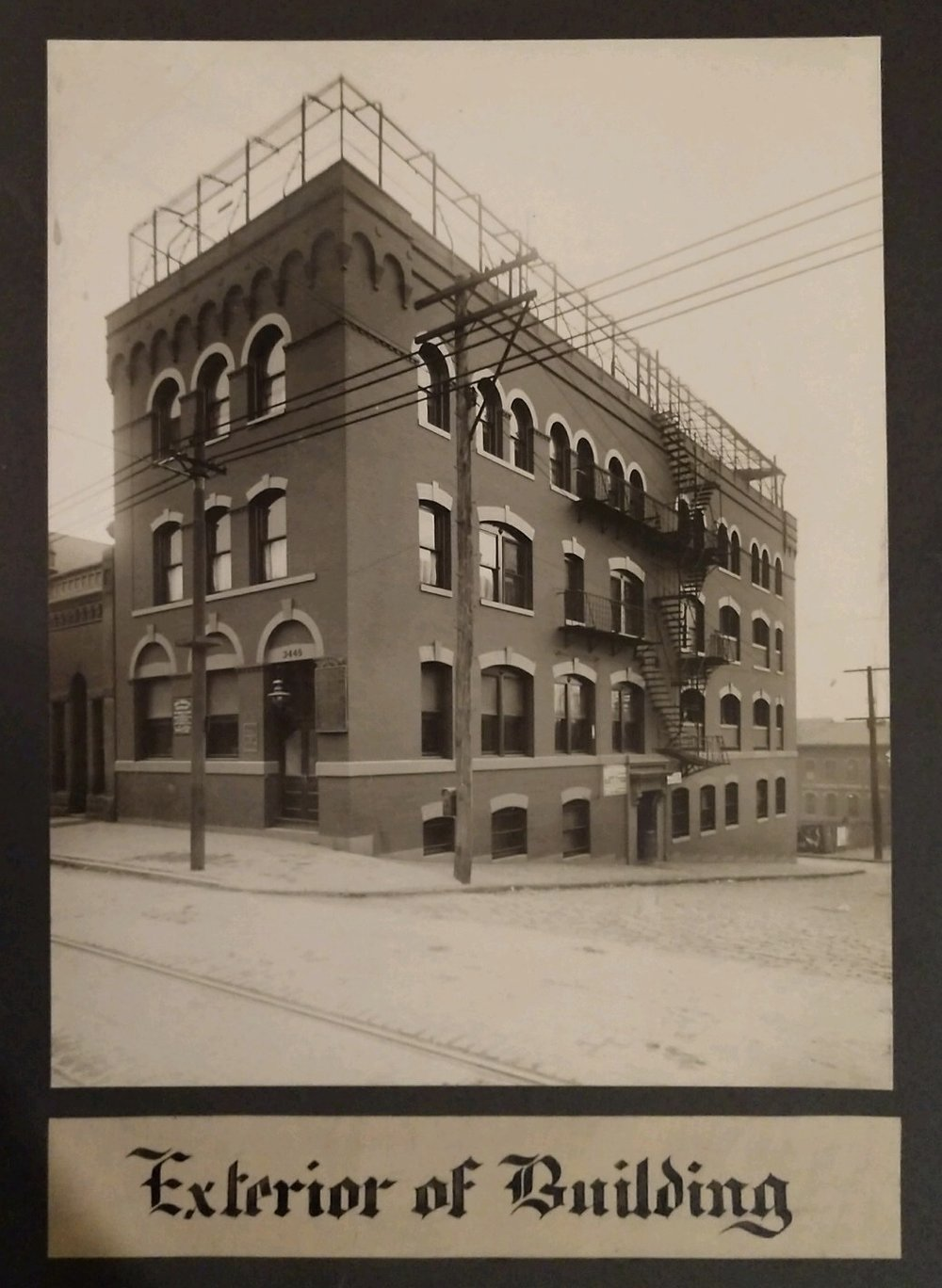
Exterior of the Former Pittsburgh Wash House

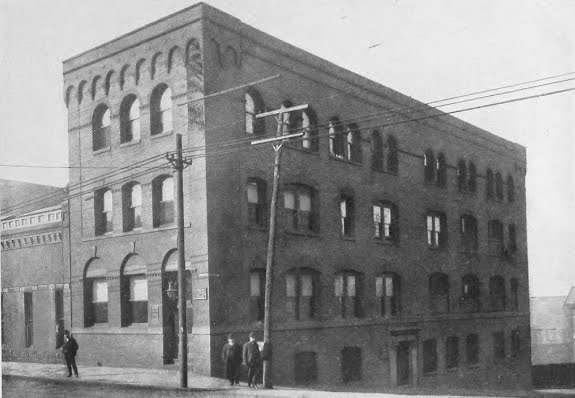
View of the exterior of the building from the early 20th century

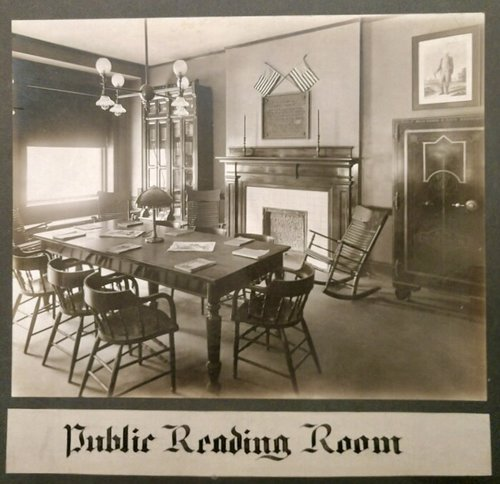
Photo of the Public Reading Room from inside the Former Pittsburgh Wash House

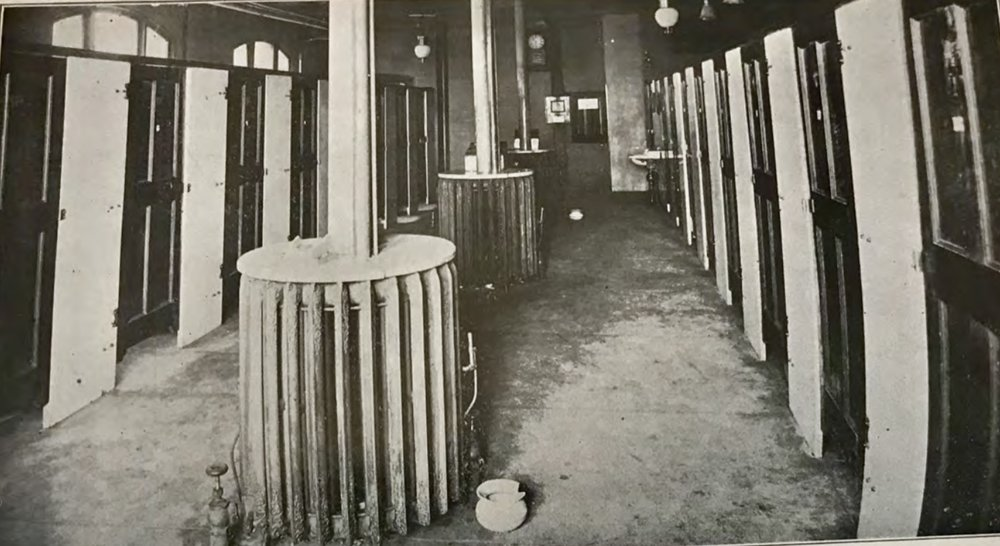
Photo of what the showers looked like in the Former Pittsburgh Wash House

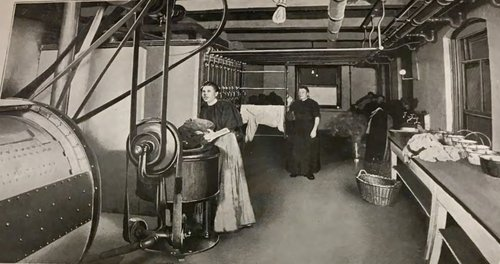
Photo of what the laundry room looked like in the Former Pittsburgh Wash House
