= George Westinghouse Jones House =

Historic house in New York, United States

- U.S. National Register of Historic Places
- Location within New York Location within the United States
- Location: 1944 Union St., Niskayuna, New York
- Coordinates: 42°47′39″N 73°53′11″W
- Area: 3 acres (1.2 ha)
- Built: 1900
- Architect: Rutan & Russell
- Architectural style: Shingle Style
- NRHP reference No.: 04000998
- Added to NRHP: September 15, 2004

George Westinghouse Jones House, also known by the Welsh name of Caermarthen, is a historic home located in the Town of Niskayuna in Schenectady County, New York. It was built about 1900 and designed by the architectural firm of Rutan & Russell. It is a rambling, 2 1/2-story gable-roofed frame residence in the Shingle Style. it features a high stone foundation, steeply pitched gable roof, a wraparound verandah, hipped roof dormers, and five tall brick chimneys. Its original owner was George Westinghouse Jones, who was a cousin of industrialist George Westinghouse and business administrator for the firm's Schenectady interests.

It was listed on the National Register of Historic Places in 2004.
