= Century Building (Pittsburgh, Pennsylvania) =

- U.S. National Register of Historic Places
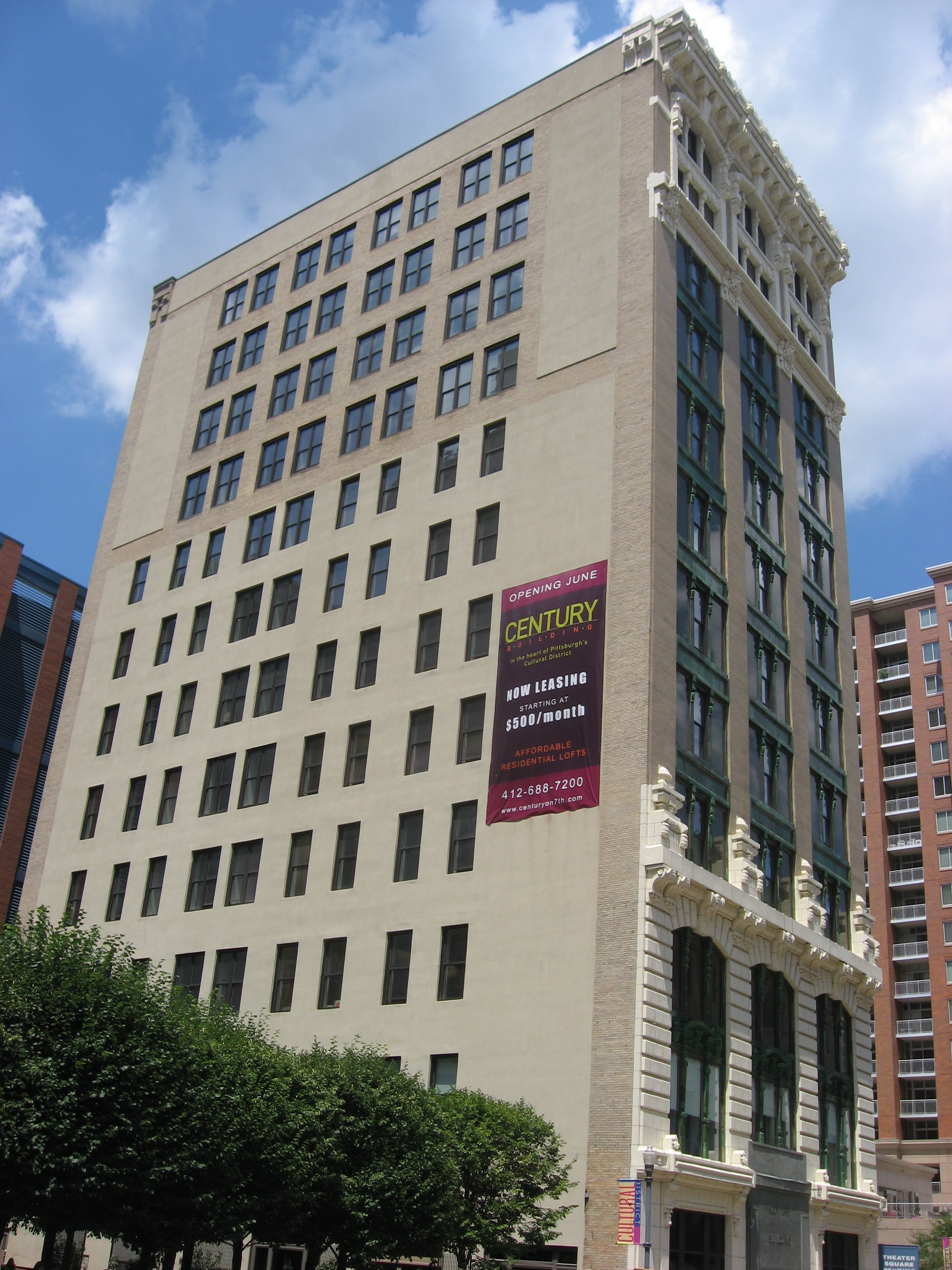

- Location within Pittsburgh Location within Pennsylvania Location within the United States
- Location: 130 7th St., Pittsburgh, Pennsylvania
- Coordinates: 40.44366°N 80.00071°W
- Area: less than one acre
- Built: 1907
- Architect: Rutan & Russell; Shenk, Henry Co.
- Architectural style: Beaux Arts, Early Commercial
- NRHP reference No.: 08000781
- Added to NRHP: August 13, 2008

The Century Building located in the Pittsburgh, Pennsylvania Cultural District, was built as an office building in 1907 by the Century Land Company. This twelve-story building currently houses a restaurant, two floors of offices and 60 units of mixed-income housing. It was listed on the National Register of Historic Places in 2008.

== Awards ==
The Century Building was awarded an AIA Pittsburgh Award of Excellence in the category of Historic Preservation in 2010.
