= Jones and Laughlin Steel Company =

American firm (1852–1968)

Jones and Laughlin Steel Corporation
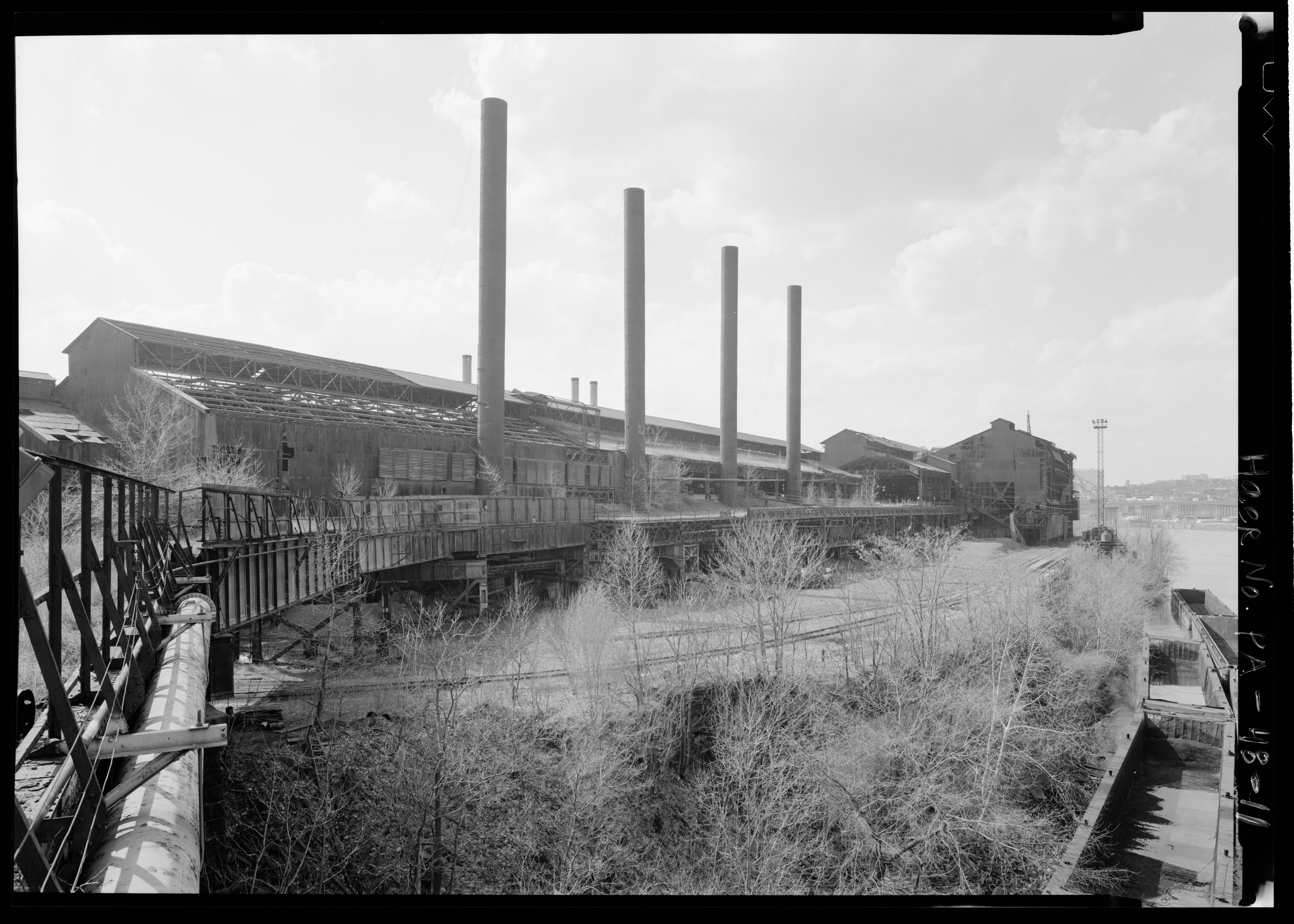
- Ruins of the J&L Steel Corp's Morgan Billet Mill Engine, 1993
- Formerly: American Iron Company
- Company type: Private
- Industry: Steel production
- Founded: 1852 in Pittsburgh, Pennsylvania, U.S.
- Founders: Bernard Lauth; Benjamin Franklin Jones
- Defunct: 1968
- Fate: Acquisition
- Headquarters: Pittsburgh, Pennsylvania
- Revenue: ▼$903.6 million (1968)
- Net income: ▼$35.8 million (1968)
- Total assets: ▼$1,092.8 million (1968)
- Total equity: ▲$703.9 million (1968)
- Number of employees: ▼39,531 (1968)
- Parent: LTV Steel
- Footnotes / references Financials via the Fortune 500's 1968 historical database. 1968 was J&L's final year before its acquisition.

Stack array of the Jones and Laughlin Pittsburgh Works on the south side of the Monongahela River, 1955.

The Jones and Laughlin Steel Corporation, also known as J&L Steel or simply as J&L, was an American steel and iron manufacturer that operated from 1852 until 1968. The enterprise began as the American Iron Company, founded in 1852 by Bernard Lauth and Benjamin Franklin Jones, about 2.5 mi (4.0 km) south of Pittsburgh along the Monongahela River. Lauth's interest was bought in 1854 by James Laughlin. The first firm to bear the name of Jones and Laughlin was organized in 1861, and headquartered at Third & Ross in downtown Pittsburgh.

== History ==
Originally producing only iron, the enterprise began the production of steel in 1886. Over the ensuing 60 years, the company expanded its facilities and its operations along both sides of the Monongahela River on the South Side of Pittsburgh and along the Ohio River in Aliquippa, Pennsylvania. The Hot Metal Bridge across the Monongahela River was built to connect Eliza blast furnaces making pig iron on the Hazelwood side of the river with the open hearth steel furnaces on the south side of the river.

In 1905, a new plant was begun in Aliquippa. The company also owned coal mines in western Pennsylvania in its early days, including some reached by an incline in Pittsburgh's South Side which connected to the railroad over the bridge adjacent to the Hot Metal Bridge. Other mines were along the nearby Becks Run, also directly connected by railroad. The incline and mines were gone before 1900, but mining continued in Pennsylvania towns such as Vestaburg and elsewhere.

The former Otis Steel company along the Cuyahoga River in Cleveland was purchased in 1942, and then in the mid-1960s, a finishing plant was constructed in Hennepin, Illinois.

In 1937, J&L was the subject of a landmark decision of the Supreme Court, NLRB v. Jones & Laughlin Steel Corp., which upheld the constitutionality of the Wagner Act and the Federal Government's power to regulate labor relations by way of the commerce clause. The decision forced J&L to recognize the labor rights of its employees including their right to unionize.

J & L Steel (known to its employees as simply "J & L", sometimes pronounced "jane ell") provided the most able competition to the Carnegie Steel Company in the vicinity of Pittsburgh. J & L also had subsidiary mills in other cities such as Los Angeles in the late 1940s.

Ling-Temco-Vought, Inc. of Texas offered to purchase 63 percent of J & L Steel on May 10, 1968. An agreement was reached on May 14, and the purchase was completed for approximately $428.5 million ($3.97 billion today) by June 1968. It took full control of the company in 1974. As a result of the Steel Crisis and the 1973 Recession, the J & L mill in Los Angeles closed.

In 1978, J & L Steel (as a subsidiary of LTV) acquired Youngstown Sheet and Tube. In 1981, J & L Steel bought a stainless steel mill from McLouth Steel Products in Detroit, which was probably an attempt to try to get closer to the auto market.

By the 1980s, the LTV Conglomerate was in full decline. In 1984, J & L was merged with Republic Steel and the name of Jones and Laughlin completely disappeared.

=== J&L Coal Incline ===
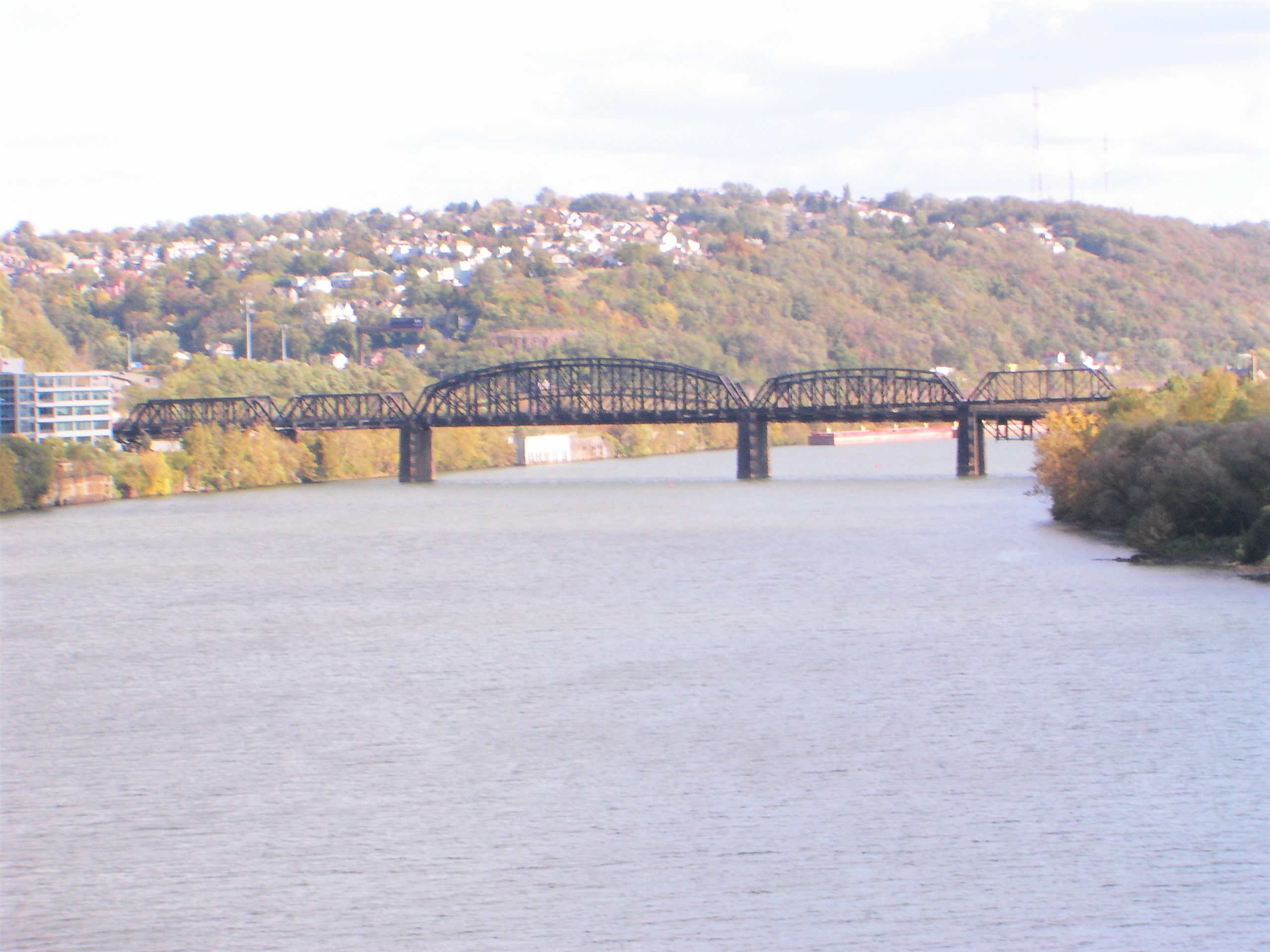
Hot Metal Bridge, formerly used by Jones and Laughlin to transport steel across the Monongahela River

The J&L Coal Incline was a 1,300-foot (400 m) incline in Pittsburgh, Pennsylvania connecting a coal mine to the J&L iron making facility. It ran from Josephine Street, between South 29th street and South 30th Street on the lower end to Sumner Street on its upper end. It was supplied with coal from the American Mine, opened in 1854.

=== From hot strip to mixed-use development ===
Dismantling of the buildings which housed J & L Steel produced an upsurge of building on the tracts of land where the buildings had stood. By September 2005, numerous new structures had been erected on both sides of the Monongahela River. The Pittsburgh Technology Center now stands on the north side of the Monongahela River where the blast furnaces once stood and the SouthSide Works, a commercial and residential development, stands on the south side where milling operations occurred. The Hot Metal Bridge has been converted into a road bridge and a pedestrian/bike bridge (which forms part of the Great Allegheny Passage).

On what was once Hazelwood Works of the J & L operations, Hazelwood Green is now a 178-acre mixed-use riverfront redevelopment site. Hazelwood Green was purchased in 2002 by Almono LP and was officially opened to the public in April 2019, with the public dedication of new roads – Hazelwood Avenue and Blair Street extensions – through the site. Mill 19, the last remaining structure from the Hazelwood Plant, is being refurbished to serve as a mixed use development including a robotics lab run by Carnegie Mellon University.

== Facilities ==
=== Aliquippa ===
A contract for the construction of four blast furnaces each outputting 500 tons per day, totaling 22 ft × 85 ft (6.7 m × 25.9 m), was awarded to the Ritter-Conley Mfg. Co. in December 1906, which at the time had blast furnaces of the same dimensions under construction for Indiana Steel Co. at Gary. The new furnaces included modern skip hoist and sealing arrangement for material charging, and two were expected to be finished in July 1907. The furnaces were to be accompanied by 16 Kennedy-Cooper hot air stoves of 22 ft × 100 ft (6.7 m × 30.5 m). Furnace #3 with 4 stoves was actually ordered in May 1907.

A bridge from Ambridge to Aliquippa, being designed in April 1907.

From the Wisconsin Engine Company, building in April 1907, 2 cross compound engines to drive a 600 kW (800 hp) generator.

From Allis-Chalmers 10 blowing engines. Also, two 250V, 94 rpm DC generators of 1,000 kW (1,300 hp) each for various plant loads ordered in April 1907 and in June 1907 four 1,000 kW Bullock engine type generators, a 500 kW (670 hp) generator set, 2 Tomlinson barometric tube converters.

=== South Side ===
In June 1907, construction was announced of four new Talbot open hearth furnaces totaling 1,000 tons per day.

== Historic sites ==
Jones & Laughlin Steel Co. is a builder of record for a number of bridges and other structures that are listed on the National Register of Historic Places.

Works include:

- Big Blue River Bridge, Twp. Rd. over Big Blue R., 1 mi. SE of Surprise, Surprise, Nebraska (Jones & Laughlin Steel Co.), NRHP-listed
- Brewer Bridge, Co. Rd. over the Niobrara R., 14.7 mi. E of Valentine, Valentine, Nebraska (Jones & Laughlin Steel Co.), NRHP-listed
- Hill Annex Mine, off US 169, Calumet, Minnesota (Jones & Laughlin Steel Co.), NRHP-listed
- Nine Bridges Bridge, private rd. over Middle Channel of the Platte R., 3.9 mi. N of Doniphan, Doniphan, Nebraska (Jones & Laughlin Steel Co.), NRHP-listed
- Prairie Dog Creek Bridge, Twp. Rd. over Prairie Dog Cr., 8.5 mi. S and 1 mi. W of Orleans. Orleans, Nebraska (Jones & Laughlin Steel Co.), NRHP-listed
- Southwest Fifth St. Bridge, SW Fifth St. over Raccoon R.. Des Moines, Iowa (Jones & Laughlin Steel Co., Killmar), NRHP-listed
- Turkey Creek Bridge, Co. Rd. over Turkey Cr., 2 mi. W and 1 mi. S of Ragan, Ragan, Nebraska (Jones & Laughlin Steel Co.), NRHP-listed

== See also ==
- National Labor Relations Board v. Jones & Laughlin Steel Corporation
- Youngstown Sheet & Tube Co. v. Sawyer
- Interstate 180 (Illinois)
