= SS William C. Moreland =

American lake freighter wrecked on Lake Superior in 1910

Coordinates: 47°25′03″N 88°19′26″W

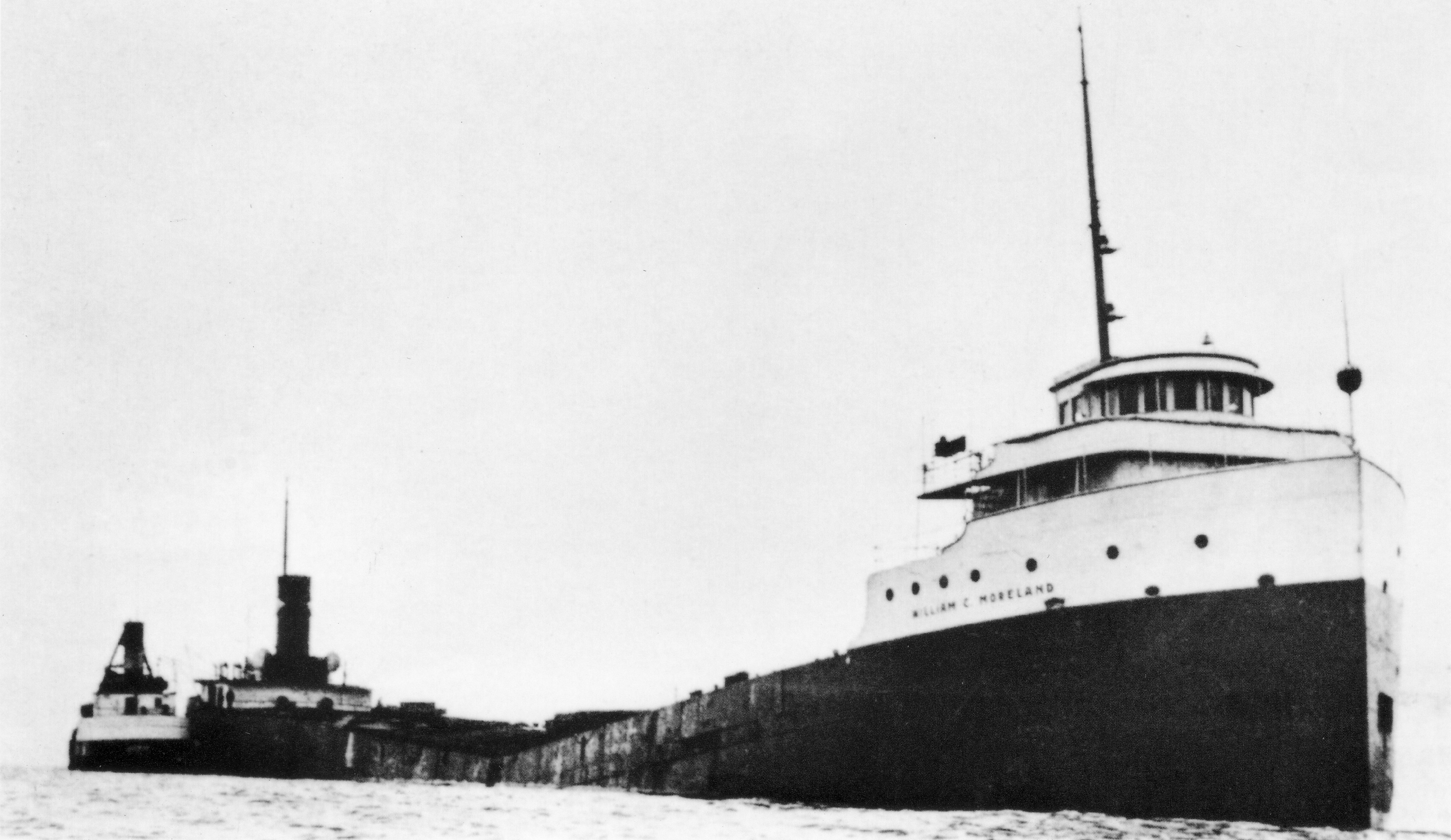
- William C. Moreland on Sawtooth Reef c. November 1910

History

United States
- Name: William C. Moreland
- Namesake: William C. Moreland
- Owner: Jones and Laughlin Steel Company
- Operator: Interstate Steamship Company
- Port of registry: Duluth, Minnesota
- Builder: American Ship Building Company, Lorain, Ohio
- Cost: ~ $450,000 ($10.9 million in 2024) (Note: Johnston, Louis & Williamson, Samuel H. (2023). "What Was the U.S. GDP Then?". MeasuringWorth. United States Gross Domestic Product deflator figures follow the MeasuringWorth series.)
- Yard number: 387
- Laid down: 10 May 1910
- Launched: 27 July 1910
- Christened: Esther Moreland
- Maiden voyage: 1 September 1910
- Out of service: 18 October 1910
- Identification: US official number 207851
- Fate: Wrecked on Lake Superior

General characteristics
- Class & type: Lake freighter
- Sister ship(s): Willis L. King; Thomas Walters
- Tonnage: 7,514 GRT; 5,803 NRT
- Length: 600 feet (182.9 m) o/a; 580 feet (176.8 m) p/p
- Beam: 58 feet (17.7 m)
- Depth: 32 feet (9.8 m)
- Installed power: Engine: 1 × 2,000 ihp (1,500 kW) 82 rpm triple expansion steam engine; Boilers: 2 × 175 pounds per square inch (1,210 kPa) Scotch marine boilers
- Propulsion: 1 × fixed pitch propeller
- Capacity: 12,000 long tons (12,193 t)
- Crew: 25

SS William C. Moreland was an American lake freighter that was in service for less than two months in late 1910. At the time of her launching on 27 July 1910, she was among the largest vessels on the Great Lakes and then became the largest to be destroyed there following her grounding on a dangerous reef on Lake Superior's Keweenaw Peninsula a few months later.

She was built between May and July 1910 by the American Ship Building Company of Lorain, Ohio for the Interstate Steamship Company, a subsidiary of Jones and Laughlin Steel Company. Less than a decade earlier, compelled by the ever growing demand for iron ore, Jones and Laughlin expanded into the Great Lakes trade to facilitate the transport of raw materials by commissioning several large freighters over a number of years, among them the William C. Moreland. She entered service early in September 1910. She usually carried coal on upbound voyages, and iron ore when downbound.

Early on 18 October 1910, William C. Moreland departed Superior, Wisconsin, on a day of calm weather, laden with 10,700 long tons (10,872 t) of iron ore destined for Ashtabula, Ohio. As a result of smoke from several forest fires on the Keweenaw Peninsula restricting their visibility, the crew misjudged their position, leading to William C. Moreland striking the Sawtooth Reef around 21:00 (EST). As a result of travelling at full speed and the momentum generated by the immense mass of her cargo, she ran far onto the reef. Efforts by the crew to back her off the reef proved unsuccessful.

Within a few days, her hull had broken into three sections. As a result of frequent turbulent weather, attempts by several salvage crews were unsuccessful in raising her wreck, which was eventually abandoned to the underwriters as a total loss. Her stern was subsequently recovered in early September 1911 and was used in the construction of the freighter Sir Trevor Dawson five years later. William C. Moreland's bow section eventually slipped off the reef into 25–40 feet (7.6–12.2 m) of water. It has since been flattened by ice and waves, eventually becoming a prominent feature of the Keweenaw Underwater Preserve.

== History ==
=== Background ===
In 1843, the gunship USS Michigan became the first iron-hulled vessel built on the Great Lakes upon her launching in Erie, Pennsylvania. Though Canadian merchants were importing iron vessels prefabricated in the United Kingdom by the mid-1840s, the first regionally produced iron-hulled merchant vessel, Merchant, would not be built until 1862. Despite Merchant's clear success proving the potential of iron hulls, ships built from wood remained preferable until the 1880s due to their lower cost, as well as the abundance of high-quality timber and workers trained in carpentry. Between the early 1870s and the mid-1880s, shipyards around the Great Lakes began to construct iron ships on a relatively large scale.

In 1884, the first steel freighters were built on the Great Lakes, with metal becoming a material used in the construction of new hulls by the 1890s. Rapidly decreasing steel prices, combined with the development of the pneumatic rivet gun and the advancement of gantry cranes enabling shipyard employees to work at an increased speed and with greater efficiency, contributed to the rapid increase in the size of lake freighters in the late 19th and early 20th centuries.

Throughout the 1880s, the iron ore trade on the Great Lakes grew quickly, primarily due to the increasing size of the lake freighters and the rise in the number of trips they made to the ore docks of Lake Superior. With the railways unable to keep up with the rapid extraction of iron ore, bulk freighters became an integral component in the region's iron ore industry. By 1890, 57% of the 16,000,000 long tons (16,256,751 t) of the iron ore produced by mines in the United States was sourced from the region surrounding Lake Superior.

With the unprecedented and rapid increase in demand for steel within the United States around the advent of the 20th century, the Jones and Laughlin Steel Company of Pittsburgh, Pennsylvania, sought to facilitate the transport of their raw materials and ventured into the Great Lakes trade in 1906. They began by ordering the construction of two identical 552-foot (168.2 m) freighters, B. F. Jones and James Laughlin, from the Great Lakes Engineering Works of Ecorse, Michigan. (Note: Both vessels were named after founders of the company, Benjamin Franklin Jones, and James H. Laughlin.) Both of the vessels operated for the Interstate Steamship company, a subsidiary of Jones and Laughlin based in Cleveland, Ohio, managed by William Horace Becker, a prominent local fleet manager.

To further meet the expanding demand for steel, Jones and Laughlin commissioned two identical vessels for the Interstate Steamship Company; William C. Moreland, and Willis L. King, the latter of which was constructed by the Great Lakes Engineering Works in Ecorse.

=== Design and construction ===
William C. Moreland (US official number 207851) was built on the banks of the Black River by the American Ship Building Company in Lorain, Ohio. She was the third and final vessel constructed at the yard in 1910. Assigned the yard_number 387, her keel was laid down on 10 May 1910. She was named in honour of William C. Moreland (1836 – 1901), a Pittsburgh city lawyer, who additionally held the position of vice president within the Jones and Laughlin Steel Company. By the time her construction concluded, William C. Moreland, one of the so-called "standard 600-footer class", was one of the largest vessels on the lakes. Her launching took place at 11:30 on 27 July, in the presence of a large crowd, which contained numerous officials from Jones and Laughlin, including her namesake. She was christened by Moreland's niece, Esther, and cost nearly $450,000 (equivalent to $10.9 million in 2024) to build.

Her hull was designed with an arched frame system meant to create an unobstructed cargo hold, while offering the strength provided by the stanchions of earlier lake freighters. She was built with 35 cargo hatches spaced 12 feet (3.7 m) apart to optimally accommodate loading at the cargo docks. The hatches provided access to her three cargo holds, which were located within the confines of three watertight bulkheads, and allowed her to carry loads of up to 12,000 long tons (12,193 t). Additionally, William C. Moreland featured side-ballast tanks located between the hull plating and the cargo hold beneath the deck arches. Her side tanks sloped inward from the cargo deck so that the bottom of her cargo hold lined up almost precisely with the outer edges of her hatch covers. This tapered "hopper" configuration allowed unloading rigs to more efficiently discharge almost all cargo from the hold, significantly reducing the reliance on manual unloading. These innovative features became universal on lake freighters around the turn of the century. (Note: Arched cargo holds and sloped side ballast tanks were first introduced to Great Lakes on the freighter Augustus B. Wolvin, built in 1904.)

The hull of William C. Moreland had an overall length of 600 feet (182.9 m), a length between perpendiculars of 580 feet (176.8 m), as well as a beam 58 feet (17.7 m) in width. The moulded depth (roughly speaking, the vertical height of William C. Moreland's hull) was 32 feet (9.8 m). The measurements of her register tonnage were calculated as 7,514 gross register tons and 5,803 net register tons, respectively.

William C. Moreland was powered by a 2,000 ihp (1,500 kW) 85 rpm triple-expansion steam engine; the cylinders of the engine were 24 inches (61.0 cm), 39 inches (99.1 cm) and 65 inches (165.1 cm) in diameter, and had a stroke of 42 inches (106.7 cm). Steam was provided by two coal–fired, single–ended Scotch marine boilers 16 feet (4.9 m) in diameter, 11 feet 6 inches (3.5 m) in length, with a working pressure of 170-pound-per-square-inch (1,200 kPa). The boilers were each fitted with 6 furnaces, accounting for a combined grate surface of 126 square feet (11.7 m^{2}), and a total heating surface of 6,338 square feet (588.8 m^{2}). Both the engine and boilers were manufactured by William C. Moreland's builder.

=== Service history and final voyage ===
Wreck location

Following the successful completion of her sea trials, William C. Moreland was accepted by and delivered to her owners. She was temporarily enrolled at Cleveland, on 23 August 1910, receiving her permanent registration in Duluth, Minnesota, on 6 September. She entered service on 1 September under Captain Claude M. Ennes, undertaking her maiden voyage in light trim for Superior, Wisconsin, where she loaded a cargo of iron ore. By mid-October, William C. Moreland had completed four voyages, usually shuttling coal on upbound voyages, and iron ore when travelling downbound. The Toronto Marine Historical Society, which extensively covered the career of William C. Moreland in a 1998 article, surmised that her lack of completed voyages was likely as a result of her return to Lorain for adjustments. She was set to be equipped with a wireless system following the completion of her fifth voyage.

William C. Moreland departed Superior, on what was to be her fifth round trip, at 03:55 (EST) on the morning of 18 October 1910, under the command of Ennes. She was laden with 10,722 long tons (10,894 t) of iron ore valued at $43,000 (equivalent to $1.04 million in 2024), destined for Ashtabula, Ohio. Weather conditions on Lake Superior were clement, lacking in notable wind or waves. As she passed Devils Island within the Apostles at 10:00, her course was altered to E × N ¼ N, placing her 1.75 miles (2.8 km) from shore, mirroring the route of her previous voyages. Around this time, her crew's visibility became partially (albeit not severely) obscured by a shroud of smoke originating from several large forest fires burning on the Keweenaw Peninsula, resulting from the prevailing drought-like conditions on the Upper Peninsula at the time. Ennes instructed his crew to report to him once Eagle Harbor Light was within sight. Shortly before 21:00, Ennes was summoned to the bridge by the mate, who, unsure of William C. Moreland's position, had sighted an unidentified flashing white light. Shortly after his arrival, William C. Moreland ran full steam onto Sawtooth Reef, 1 mile (1.6 km) from Eagle River, Michigan, and 21 miles (33.8 km) northeast of the life–saving station at the Portage Canal. Owing to her speed and extreme inertia resulting from the immense mass of her cargo, William C. Moreland struck and practically bounced over the first ridges of the reef, coming to a halt over the second ridges. Her bow and the aft end of her mid section came to rest on the reef, with her bow in 16 feet (4.9 m) of water, her stern in 19 feet (5.8 m), while her mid section (around the 22nd cargo hatch) lay 30 feet (9.1 m) above the lake bottom. Her crew attempted to back her off the reef, to no avail. Both of her first compartments on both port and starboard sides, as well as her forepeak filled with water as a result of damage sustained.

Ennes and two crewmen took a yawl ashore by 23:30 to notify both Becker and the surfboat crew from the Portage Life–Saving Station of the grounding by wire and telephone respectively. The surfboat crew and Ennes both arrived on the scene at roughly 03:00 on 19 October. At roughly 07:00, the beginnings of a storm encroached upon the wrecked William C. Moreland from the north-northeast, gradually worsening until achieving gale force winds by 12:00. The severe weather conditions necessitated the evacuation of the 25 stranded crewmen over the course of two trips to the shore, removing 12 on the first, and 13 on the second. Prior to departing William C. Moreland's wreck, her crew filled her ballast tanks to prevent her from suffering possible further damage through her hull pounding on the reef during the storm.

Between 04:00 and 05:00 on 20 October, the wind had dissipated somewhat, and five crewmen (Ennes, the mate, engineer, oiler and steward) were taken back to the grounded freighter at around 08:00. It was apparent that the previous night's storm had pushed William C. Moreland further onto the reef, her cargo holds were flooded, and her midsection had developed a pronounced sag. Since the engine and boiler rooms remained free of water, her crew attempted to raise steam. Shortly afterwards, William C. Moreland's hull fractured between the 10th and 11th hatches, and those on board left the ship. At 14:00, her hull broke again, this time between the 22nd and 23rd hatches. At the time, she was the sixteenth vessel to run aground on Sawtooth Reef.

== Wreck ==
=== Salvage ===
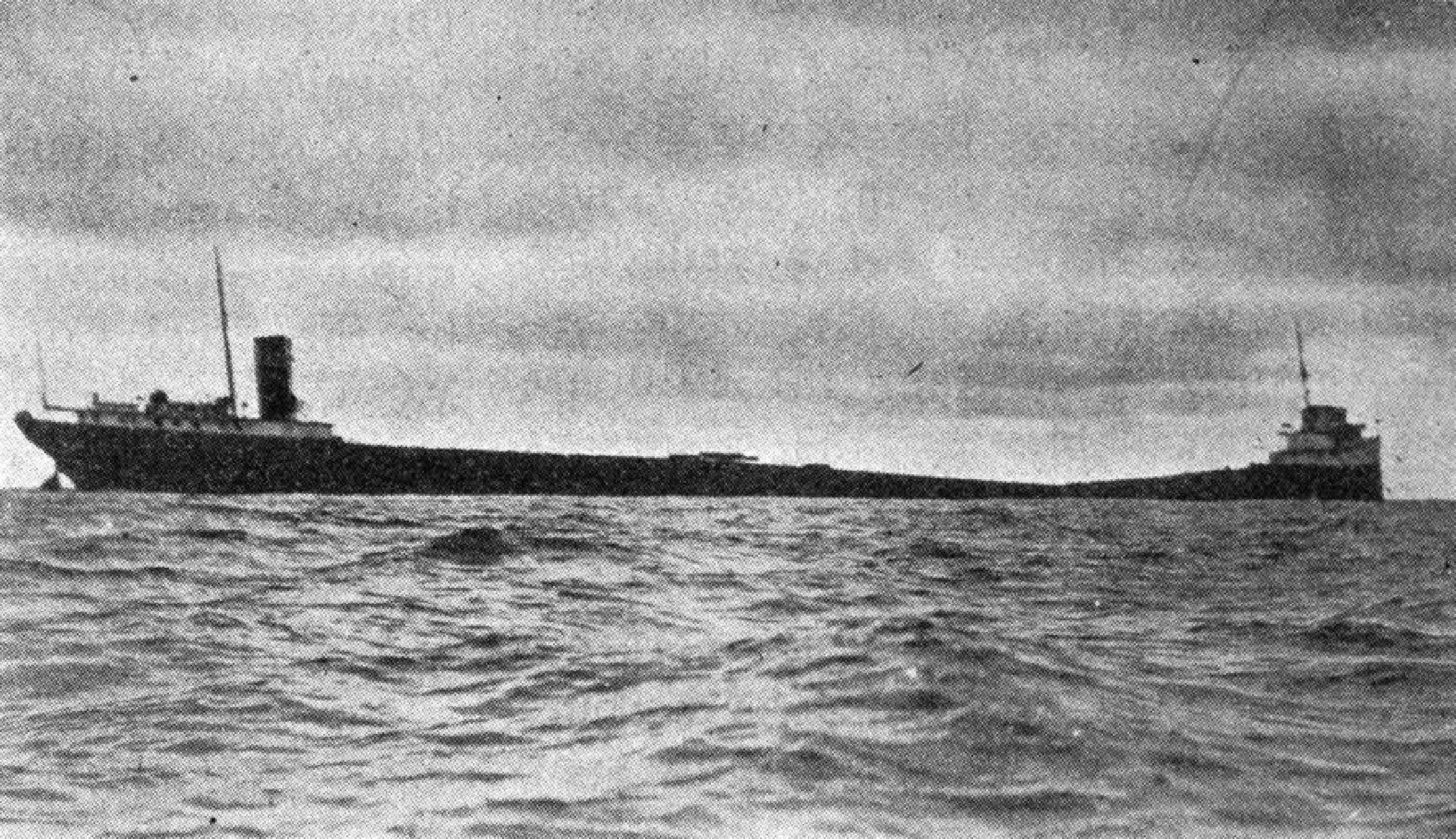
William C. Moreland's wreck, clearly showing the fractured state of her hull

Captain Joseph Kidd of Duluth, a representative of the underwriters, and Captain William H. Hill, Interstate Steamship Company's marine superintendent, were placed in charge of the salvage efforts on the wreck. On 20 October 1910, the tugboat James Whalen and lighter Empire of the Canadian Towing & Wrecking Company Ltd. arrived on the scene from Fort William, Ontario, while the wrecking tug Favorite and the tug C. L. Boynton of the Great Lakes Towing Company arrived on 21 October, from Port Huron, Michigan. (Note: The Toronto Marine Historical Society stated C. L. Boynton travelled to the wreck site from the Soo Locks, rather than Port Huron.) While appraising the state of the wreck, Kidd determined that although jettisoning the iron ore had the potential to worsen the fracturing of William C. Moreland's hull, it was only feasible option to allow for a successful salvage. After the arrival of Favorite and C. L. Boynton, lightering work began. By 22:00, salvage crews succeeded in removing roughly 2,000–2,500 long tons (2,032–2,540 t) of iron ore, when a gale with 24 miles per hour (38.6 km/h) winds forced the abandonment of the operation. The salvage crews sought shelter in Lily Pond, within the Portage Canal. The crack between the 22nd and 23rd hatches further widened over the nights of 22 and 23 October, her hull settling by 18 inches (45.7 cm) at the stern. (Note: The Detroit Free Press reported that William C. Moreland's hull broke for a third time, abreast of the 4th cargo hatch. This was not reported by any further sources.)

Turbulent weather prohibited resuming work on the wreck until 04:00 on 23 October. Favorite's pumps were set at the 6th, 8th, 14th and 18th hatches, while William C. Moreland's own pumps were likewise activated. That same day, the wrecking tug J. D. Morrison and the lighter Imperial arrived at the site from Port Arthur, Ontario. However, later that day, after further jettisoning a significant amount of William C. Moreland's cargo, another strong storm forced the salvors to seek shelter within the Portage Canal. The weather rendered them unable to reach the wreck until 25 October, when efforts to remove her cargo recommenced, and the holes in her hull were patched as well as possible. Growing wind once again forced the abandonment of the wreck until about 12:00 the next day, where efforts to remove her cargo continued, but were once again disrupted by heavy weather, again necessitating a retreat into the Portage Canal. On 27 October, The Buffalo Commercial of Buffalo, New York, reported that chances of recovering William C. Moreland would "not be very good" if weather continuously forced the wreckers to abandon their efforts. The Collingwood Bulletin of Collingwood, Ontario, reported the wreckers' intention to cut the wreck in two, to salvage her stern and machinery. Work on the wreck resumed at around 09:00 on 30 October, and continued until 20:00, when weather again thwarted the salvagers' efforts. They were able to return to the wreck at approximately 11:00 the following day. By 10:00 on 1 November, William C. Moreland's hull had been re–floated around the 12th hatch, while her third cargo hold had almost been pumped free of water. However, by 16:00, her hull began to twist and break apart, leading to the flooding of the first cargo hold. The wind increased, prompting salvors to abandon her wreck once again. In a report by The Plain Dealer, Hill claimed William C. Moreland's wreck was "in bad shape and is not worth saving".

Kidd described William C. Moreland as "about the worst wreck" he had ever seen on the Great Lakes. Owing to the condition of the wreck and the difficulties in salvaging it, Becker abandoned her to the underwriters as a total loss on 2 November, by which time approximately 7,000 long tons (7,112 t) of her cargo had been discarded into Lake Superior. By the time she was abandoned, her hull was in three pieces, all roughly identical in length. The insurers paid $392,000 (equivalent to $9.51 million in 2024) for William C. Moreland. (Note: Her cargo was valued at $50,000 (equivalent to $1.21 million in 2024), while the cost of the salvage operations amounted to almost $45,000 (equivalent to $1.09 million in 2024).) At the time of her grounding, she was the largest vessel ever lost on the Great Lakes. (Note: Since William C. Moreland's wreck was partially recovered, the 550-foot (167.6 m) Canadian freighter James Carruthers, lost in the Great Lakes Storm of 1913, became the largest complete wreck on the lakes. She was superseded by the 552-foot (168.2 m) freighters Chester A. Congdon and D.R. Hanna, lost in 1918 and 1919 respectively, which remained the largest complete wrecks on the lakes until the loss of the self-unloader Carl D. Bradley in 1958.)

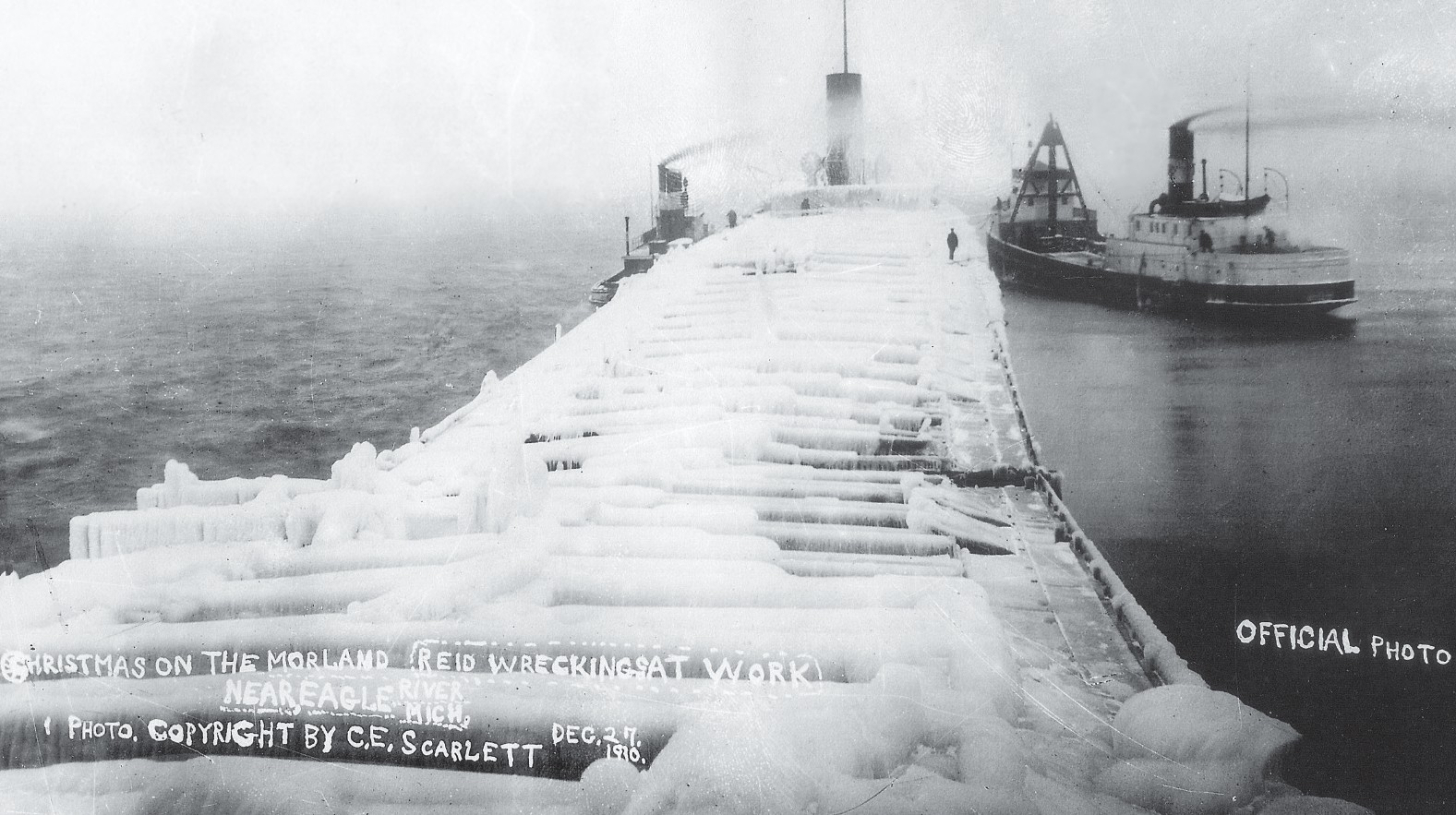
William C. Moreland's buckled hull in December 1910, Sarnia City and Manistique (respectively) in the background

On 20 November, the underwriters awarded the Reid Wrecking Company of Sarnia, Ontario, and Port Huron, a "no–cure/no–pay" contract to salvage William C. Moreland. (Note: The Reid Wrecking Company was run by Captain James R. Reid, and his son, Captain Thomas Reid, also known as J.T. "Tom" Reid.) If successful in raising the wreck, the contract stipulated the Reid Wrecking Company would receive 65% of the wreck's sale price, or roughly $75,000 (equivalent to $1.82 million in 2024), upon its successful delivery to Superior. (Note: "No–cure/no–pay" denotes a salvage contract where the salvor receives payment only if the operation is successful.) Shortly after obtaining the salvage contract, James and Thomas Reid, as well as a team led by diver Louis Meyers arrived at the wreck with the steam lighter Manistique, and the tug Sarnia City. They resumed the removal of the iron ore from William C. Moreland's cargo holds, a process which proceeded slowly, since the cargo had become concreted. Upon the arrival of the Reid Wrecking company, William C. Moreland's hull was reportedly covered in ice between 6 inches (15.2 cm) and 1 foot (30.5 cm) thick. The wrecking crew utilised hot water to remove the ice from the wreck. On 28 November, her hull was reported to have been patched, pumped free of water, and afloat. The following day, amended reports were issued. James Reid reported William C. Moreland to be free of water once again on 7 December, with two pumps keeping her hull dry. Sometime prior to 15 December, two accidents occurred during the salvage operations; the helmsman of Manistique had his fingers crushed, while a workman fell overboard, almost freezing to death before being rescued. Sometime during that same month, James Reid suffered a stroke, forcing him to head for Chicago, Illinois, for treatment, leaving Thomas to continue the salvage. He returned to the wreck on 30 December with the derricked turret deck ship Turret Bell, to continue work on William C. Moreland. Over the course of the entire month, the Reid Wrecking Company were able to work on William C. Moreland for fewer than fifteen days. Poor weather once again repeatedly disrupted work on the wreck.

By 1 January 1911, the wrecking crew succeeded in drilling and reinforcing the hull. Shortly afterwards, a bad storm swept Lake Superior, resulting in over 5 feet (1.5 m) of snow, forcing Manistique to shelter in Port Arthur, while Sarnia City sought refuge in the Portage Canal. Poor weather conditions persisted for the remainder of January and February, preventing the Reid Wrecking Company from continuing their work on William C. Moreland. Once the weather permitted their return, they built rudimentary bulkheads from logs at each end of the break at the 14th hatch, allowing them to pump the hull dry. Initially, they had planned solely to patch the aft end of the hull, with the intention of salvaging only the stern section. They lashed the wreck with together with chains, and attached canvasses. Between January and 19 May, looters ransacked William C. Moreland's wreck, stripping away all of her furnishings and equipment, with the exception of the few items removed for storage in Houghton, Michigan.

William C. Moreland was floated free of the reef at approximately 22:00, on 1 June. However, despite the urgency with which she needed to be pulled clear of the reef, no vessel was available to do so. The tug James Reid was docked in Houghton, unable to reach the wreck at short notice, while Manistique lost two propeller blades during previous blasting operations on the wreck. In an attempt to clear her of the reef, William C. Moreland's steam was raised, providing power to the pumps and dynamo. However, her rudder had failed, preventing a successful operation. Upon the arrival of James Reid from Houghton, she began working on William C. Moreland. While rendering assistance, her propeller cut the cables tethering the patches to William C. Moreland's hull, detaching them, and causing her to sink again, a few hours after she was raised. She sank roughly 2 miles (3.2 km) west of the original wreck site, her bow resting on the reef, her stern in 30 feet (9.1 m) of water, by which time only the top of her pilothouse and aft boat deck were visible above the water. The new tug S. M. Fischer arrived on the scene to provide steam for the pumps, while Manistique began removing the remaining 3,000 long tons (3,048 t) of ore in William C. Moreland's hold. On 28 June, a severe snow storm drove the wrecking crew to retreat once again. By mid-July, the stern section of William C. Moreland had been pumped dry once again. However, on 24 July, another storm struck the wreck, tearing the stern away from the rest of her hull, leading the salvage crew to concentrate solely on raising it instead.

The wrecking crew utilised timber cut from trees near the wreck to construct further rudimentary bulkheads within the stern. On 28 August, they succeeded in towing the stern into shallower water, where they reinforced the bulkheads, before using Manistique and the tug Cora A. Sheldon to successfully tow it to safety within the Portage Canal on 1 September, beaching it in close proximity to the life–saving station. A total of 278 feet (84.7 m) of the hull, including 11 cargo hatches, was saved, at a cost of approximately $40,000 (equivalent to $976,498 in 2024). The remainder of William C. Moreland's hull slipped off the reef between late 1911, and early 1912.

=== Aftermath ===
Jones and Laughlin commissioned the American Ship Building Company to build the replacement for William C. Moreland, the virtually identical freighter Thomas Walters. She was launched on 25 March 1911, in Lorain, beginning her maiden voyage on 12 May, only three days before the registry on William C. Moreland ended.

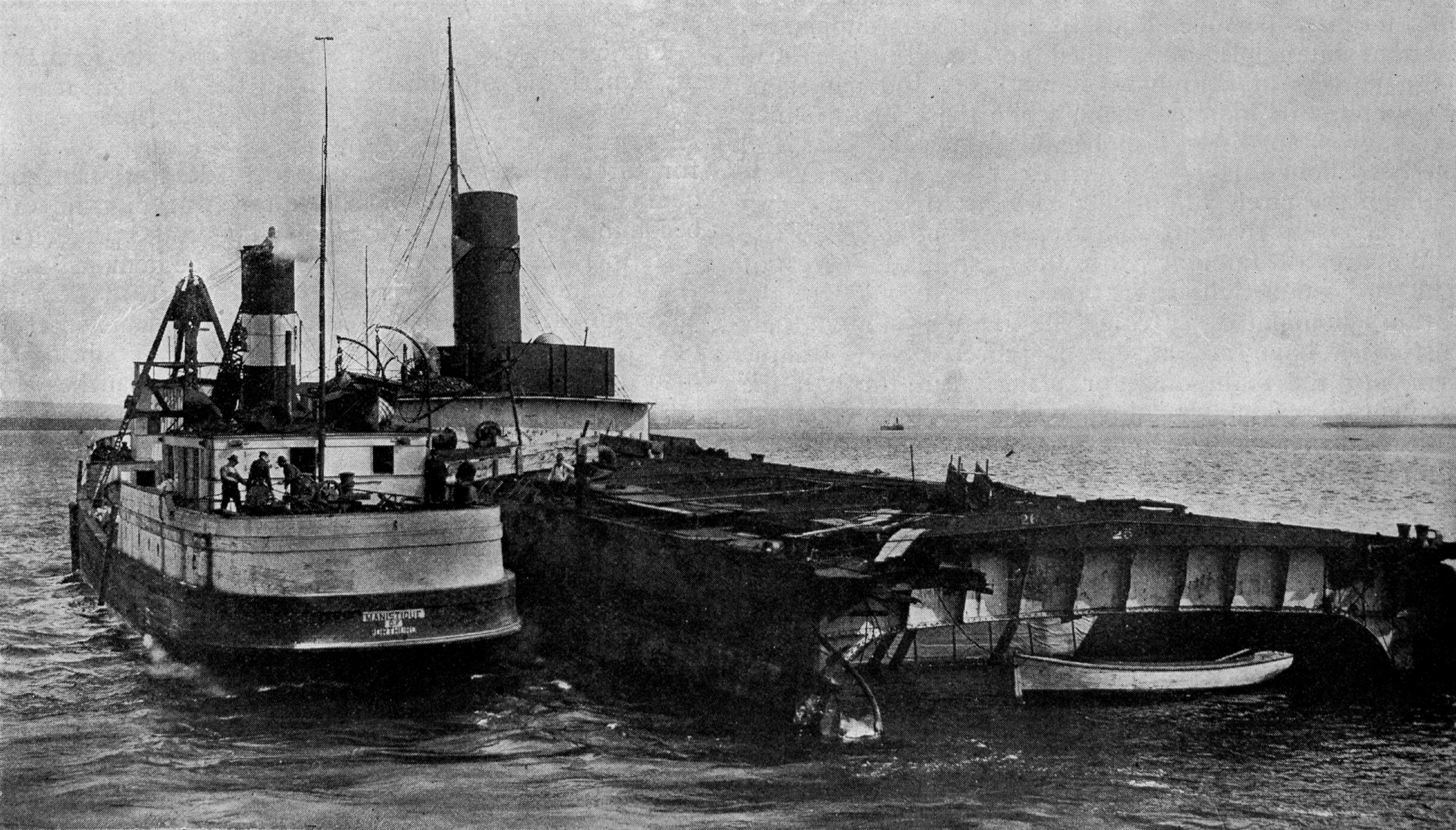
William C. Moreland's stern section en route to Detroit, in 1912

While the initial salvage contract instructed the Reid Wrecking Company to deliver William C. Moreland's aft section to Superior, Thomas Reid wanted to tow her to Fort William, anticipating a higher chance of selling the wreck at the Canadian port, under the condition that if the wreck could not be sold, he would tow it to Superior instead. However, the wreck remained within the Portage Canal for over a year, until the underwriters demanded its transport to Detroit, Michigan, for repairs. On 4 September 1912, tugs Manistique and James Reid departed the Portage Canal with William C. Moreland's stern in tow, with Thomas Reid on board, bound for Detroit. While sailing off Thunder Bay, the tow encountered a northeasterly gale, which almost sank the stern section. Manistique left the tow, while James Reid and the stern sought shelter in Thunder Bay. The tow reached Port Huron, on 16 September, when one of the pumps on William C. Moreland's stern failed, necessitating her beaching in shallow water. On 18 September, after her pump had been repaired and her hull was free of water, William C. Moreland was towed across the St. Clair River to Sarnia, where she was positioned under the unloading dock at Point Edward, Ontario, where the remainder of the cargo in her hold was removed. On 26 September, joined by the tug S. M. Fischer, the tow began its three-day journey to Detroit. The stern was eventually placed in dry dock at the Great Lakes Engineering Works in Ecorse, on 29 September, where the bulkhead was strengthened, for around $1,700 (equivalent to $39,872 in 2024). The section was advertised for sale, but failed to receive any bids. (Note: In total, the costs accrued through transporting the wreck to Detroit, dry docking it, and returning it to Port Huron, amounted to $16,414.46 (equivalent to $382,131 in 2024).)

Next, William C. Moreland's stern was moved to the Canadian Pacific Railway dock in Windsor, Ontario, on 29 November, where it sat for almost a year, occasionally being pumped free of water by Manistique. Eventually, the Canadian Pacific Railway demanded the hulk's removal. Manistique and S. M. Fischer arrived on 7 October 1913, to pump the wreck dry, and tow it up to Port Huron. Arriving on 17 October, William C. Moreland's stern was deposited within the Reid boneyard, where it remained for another two years. In late 1915, the engine and boilers of the stern section were returned to an operable state.

On 22 November 1915, the underwriters received and accepted a bid of $55,650 (equivalent to $1.24 million in 2024) for the stern section, from Roy M. Wolvin and Captain Joseph W. Norcross, two of the founders and executives of Canada Steamship Lines. (Note: The underwriters received $13,732.44 (equivalent to $307,156 in 2024) from the sale, while the Reid Wrecking Company received $25,503.10 (equivalent to $570,433 in 2024).) (Note: Roy M. Wolvin was the nephew of Great Lakes shipping magnate Augustus B. Wolvin, while Joseph W. Norcross was the managing director of Canada Steamship Lines.) Wolvin and Norcross' decision to purchase the wrecked vessel's stern stemmed from the shortage of ships in light of the First World War, due to many lake vessels being sent to salt water for wartime service. The tonnage required to transport a quantity of freight previously unseen on the lakes further increased the wreck's value. The task of surveying and restoring William C. Moreland's stern to seaworthy condition was allotted to marine architects John and Allen Smith of Cleveland. Due to shipyards on the lakes engaging in the construction vessels for the war effort, labour shortages, as well as the scarcity and exorbitant price of materials, finding a firm to build and attach a new forward section to the stern proved challenging. Eventually, the contract was awarded to the Superior Shipbuilding Company of Superior. The contract was the last for a privately owned vessel on the lakes for the remainder of the war.

The stern section was once again transported to Detroit for the installation of a bulkhead. In May 1916, James Reid and S. M. Fischer left Port Huron, for Superior, the stern in tow. The section was towed stern-first, to reduce stress on the bulkhead, with S. M. Fischer ahead, and James Reid astern. The tow arrived at the Soo Locks around 12:00 on 21 May, passing through the Poe Lock, with a large crowd on the shoreline in attendance. The journey, which lasted three weeks was almost continuously beset by poor weather, with a gale causing the towline between the tugs and the stern to break at one point, close to the Soo Locks.

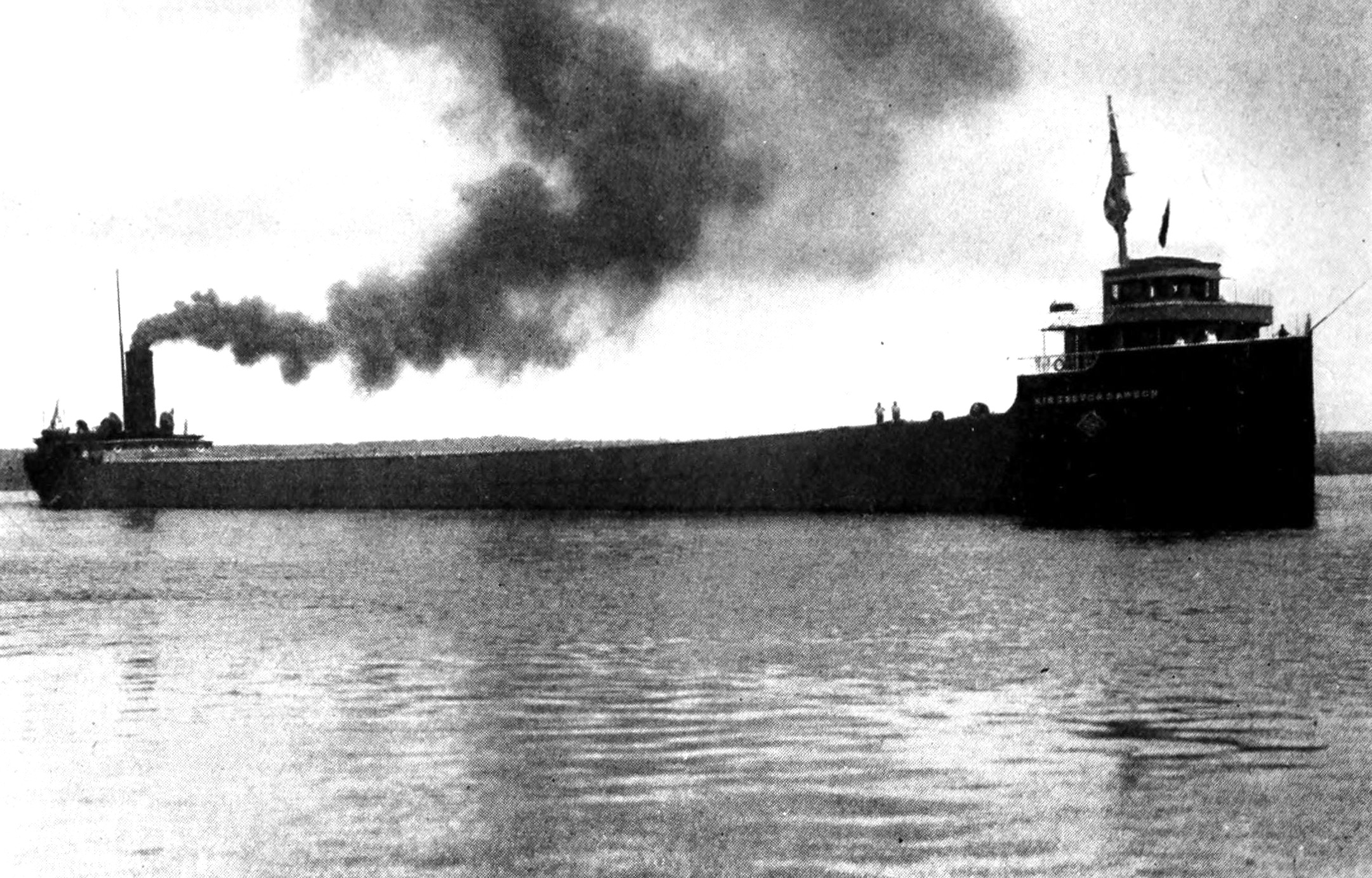
Sir Trevor Dawson

Photogrammetry model of William C. Moreland's wreck

The tow arrived in Superior on 29 May 1916, and William C. Moreland's stern was placed in dry dock, while the shipyard began building the new 322 feet (98.1 m) bow section, designed to replicate the exact dimensions of William C. Moreland. (Note: The new bow was built for approximately $1,000 (equivalent to $19,854 in 2024) per 1 foot (0.3 m), or $322,000 (equivalent to $6.39 million in 2024).) Upon inspection, the stern section proved to be in poor condition, requiring extensive repairs. 165 feet (50.3 m) of her bottom, from the 125th frame to the engine room required replacement, as did the hopper sides, a deck arch, and the entire electrical system. The aft deckhouse also required a complete rebuild, as did the ballast pipes, the plumbing, steam pipes, as well as the steering engine, chains and cables. The engine and boilers were found to be in good condition. The greatest challenge during the construction proved to be the determination of the lowest point of the stern section's sheer, and designing the new bow section in accordance with it. Once the new bow section was completed, the dry dock containing the stern was flooded. The bow was floated in and conjoined to the stern after the dry dock was drained, and the two sections were pulled together. The new vessel cost $515,000 (equivalent to $10.2 million in 2024) to build. (Note: In addition to the capital expended in purchasing the stern, the cost of the repairs prior to its departure amounted to $3,000 (equivalent to $59,563 in 2024), those of the tow to Superior, to $10,000 (equivalent to $198,544 in 2024), the rebuilding and repair costs to the stern to $54,000 (equivalent to $1.07 million in 2024), and those for the overhaul of the engine, boilers and auxhilliary machinery to $65,000 (equivalent to $1.29 million in 2024).)

The completed vessel was launched without the traditional ceremony on 9 September as hull number 524, causing some slight damage to the vessel's frame and hull plates. An official christening ceremony took place on 18 October 1916, exactly six years after William C. Moreland wrecked. The new vessel was given the name Sir Trevor Dawson (US official number 214499), in honour of English businessman Trevor Dawson. She was placed under the ownership of the American Interlake Line, a subsidiary of Canada Steamship Lines. Sir Trevor Dawson was sold and renamed multiple times, before being scrapped in Cartagena, Spain, in 1970, under the name Parkdale, becoming the 99th lake freighter to be sold overseas for scrapping.

The remains of William C. Moreland's forward section rest in 25–40 feet (7.6–12.2 m) of water, roughly 1/4 mile (0.4 km) from Eagle River. Despite being flattened as a result of decades of exposure to ice and waves, significant identifiable portions of her bow and machinery remain at the site. Most of the wreck site consists of the bow's sides, bottom, and deck, with a windlass also present. It has become a prominent feature of the Keweenaw Underwater Preserve, as its largest wreck.

== Sources ==
- "A Few Days More for the Moreland". Buffalo, New York: The Buffalo News. 1911 – via Newspapers.com.
- Baillod, Brendon (2003). "William C. Moreland". Madison, Wisconsin: Great Lakes Shipwreck Research. Archived from the original on 22 December 2017.
- Bowlus, W. Bruce (2010). Iron Ore Transport on the Great Lakes: The Development of a Delivery System to Feed American Industry. Jefferson, North Carolina: McFarland & Company, Inc. ISBN 978-0-786433-26-1.
- Bugbee, Gordon P. (February 1962a). "Iron Merchant Ships: An Upper Lakes Centennial - Part One" (PDF). Telescope. 11 (2). Detroit, Michigan: Great Lakes Maritime Institute: 24–27 – via Maritime History of the Great Lakes.
- Bugbee, Gordon P. (March 1962b). "Iron Merchant Ships: An Upper Lakes Cenntenial – Part Two" (PDF). Telescope. 11 (3). Detroit, Michigan: Great Lakes Maritime Institute: 46–51 – via Maritime History of the Great Lakes.
- "Can Only Save Part of Vessel". Cleveland, Ohio: The Plain Dealer. 1910 – via Newspapers.com.
- "Capt. Reid Has Reinforcements". The Calumet News. Calumet, Michigan. 1910 – via Newspapers.com.
- "Choctaw Shipwreck Site National Register of Historic Places Registration Form" (PDF). Washington D.C.: National Park Service. 2018. Archived from the original (PDF) on 1 January 2019.
- "Crew of Moreland Escape in Boats". Buffalo, New York: The Buffalo News. 1910 – via Newspapers.com.
- Driftmyer, G. E. (1973). "The Standard 600-Footer". Detroit, Michigan: Great Lakes Maritime Institute.
- Dutton, Fred W. (1949a). "The William C. Moreland – Part I". Toledo, Ohio: Inland Seas – via National Museum of the Great Lakes.
- Dutton, Fred W. (1949b). "The William C. Moreland – Part II". Toledo, Ohio: Inland Seas – via National Museum of the Great Lakes.
- "Echo Soundings: Marine News of 1910–1911". Amherstburg, Ontario: Amherstburg Echo. 1910–1911 – via maritimehistoryofthegreatlakes.ca.
- "Freighter is Named". Buffalo, New York: The Buffalo News. 1910 – via Newspapers.com.
- Gerred, Janice H. (1988). "The Wreck of the Wm. C. Moreland". Toledo, Ohio: Inland Seas – via National Museum of the Great Lakes.
- "Huge Freighter is Given Its Baptism". Pittsburgh, Pennsylvania: The Pittsburgh Post. 1910 – via Newspapers.com.
- "International Convention on Salvage". London, United Kingdom: International Maritime Organization. 1996.
- "Is It So?". Buffalo, New York: The Buffalo Enquirer. 1910 – via Newspapers.com.
- Kohl, Cris (2005). The 100 Best Great Lakes Shipwrecks – Volume II. West Chicago, Illinois: Seawolf Communications. ISBN 978-0-9679-9766-7.
- "Launched Another Boat at Lorain". Elyria, Ohio: The Elyria Republican. 1910 – via Newspapers.com.
- "Looks Bad for Wrecked Boat". The Plain Dealer. Cleveland, Ohio. 1910 – via Newspapers.com.
- "Marine Annual Meetings on Tues". Collingwood Bulletin. Collingwood, Ontario. 1911 – via maritimehistoryofthegreatlakes.ca.
- "Marine News". The Buffalo Commercial. Buffalo, New York. 1910 – via Newspapers.com.
- "Marine News". Collingwood Bulletin. Collingwood, Ontario. 1910 – via maritimehistoryofthegreatlakes.ca.
- Meier, Skip (2011). "Great Lakes Ships to Be Remembered No. 35: William C. Moreland" (PDF). Detroit, Michigan: Marine Historical Society of Detroit. Archived from the original (PDF) on 24 July 2020.
- Merryman, Ken (2025). "Shipwreck William C. Moreland". Golden Valley, Minnesota: Great Lakes Shipwreck Preservation Society.
- "Moreland at Duluth". The Buffalo News. Buffalo, New York. 1916 – via Newspapers.com.
- "Moreland Covered With Ice". The Buffalo Commercial. Buffalo, New York. 1910 – via Newspapers.com.
- "Moreland Looted". Buffalo, New York: The Buffalo News. 1910 – via Newspapers.com.
- "Moreland Still On". Buffalo Courier. Buffalo, New York. 1910 – via Newspapers.com.
- "Ship Named for Big Steel Man". The Plain Dealer. Cleveland, Ohio. 1910 – via Newspapers.com.
- "Ship of the Month No. 241: William C. Moreland". Toronto, Ontario: Toronto Marine Historical Society. 1998.
- "Sixteen Ships Wrecked on Dangerous Reef". The Buffalo News. Buffalo, New York. 1910 – via Newspapers.com.
- "Still on the Rocks". The Buffalo Commercial. Buffalo, New York. 1910 – via Newspapers.com.
- Stonehouse, Frederick (1990) [1984]. Went Missing, II. Au Train, Michigan: Avery Color Studios. ISBN 978-0-932212-37-5.
- "The Marine Review: Volume 40, Number 8 – August 1910". The Marine Review. Cleveland, Ohio. 1910. Within the "Lake Ship Building" section on pages 334 and 336 – via maritimehistoryofthegreatlakes.ca.
- "The Marine Review: Volume 40, Number 11 – November 1910". The Marine Review. Cleveland, Ohio. 1910. Within the "Accidents to Lake Vessels" section on page 466 – via maritimehistoryofthegreatlakes.ca.
- "The Marine Review: Volume 41, Number 4 – April 1911". The Marine Review. Cleveland, Ohio. 1911. "Lake Launchings" section on page 158 – via maritimehistoryofthegreatlakes.ca.
- "The Marine Review: Volume 41, Number 9 – September 1911". The Marine Review. Cleveland, Ohio. 1911. Within the "Around the Lakes" section on page 346 – via maritimehistoryofthegreatlakes.ca.
- "The Marine Review: Volume 42, Number 11 – November 1912". The Marine Review. Cleveland, Ohio. 1912. Within the "Wreck of the William C. Moreland" section on page 390 – via maritimehistoryofthegreatlakes.ca.
- "The Marine Review: Volume 46, Number 8 – August 1916". The Marine Review. Cleveland, Ohio. 1912. Within the "Fitting New Bow to Salvaged Stern" section on page 266 – via maritimehistoryofthegreatlakes.ca.
- "The Reid Wrecking Company Will Try to Float the Steamer Moreland". The Buffalo Commercial. Buffalo, New York. 1910 – via Newspapers.com.
- "The Sunken Steamer W.C. Moreland is Again Reported Out of Water". The Buffalo Commercial. Buffalo, New York. 1910 – via Newspapers.com.
- Thompson, Mark L. (1994). Queen of the Lakes. Detroit, Michigan: Wayne State University Press. ISBN 0-8143-2393-6.
- "Took Crew Off Stranded Ship". The Plain Dealer. Cleveland, Ohio. 1910 – via Newspapers.com.
- "W. C. Moreland's Life Has Ended". The Buffalo Commercial. Pittsburgh, Pennsylvania. 1901 – via The Pittsburgh Post.
- Wicklund, Richard H. (1977). "Telescope – Volume 26, Number 5". Detroit, Michigan: Great Lakes Maritime Institute.
- "William C. Moreland". Bowling Green, Ohio: Bowling Green State University. Archived from the original on 14 January 2018.
- "William C. Moreland (1910, Bulk Freighter)". Alpena, Michigan: Alpena County George N. Fletcher Public Library. 2025.
- "Working on the Moreland". Buffalo, New York: The Buffalo News. 1910 – via Newspapers.com.
- "Wrecked Boat in Three Pieces". The Plain Dealer. Cleveland, Ohio. 1910 – via Newspapers.com.
- "Wreckers Quit the Moreland". Detroit Free Press. Detroit, Michigan. 1910 – via Newspapers.com.
- "Wreck of the Moreland Attracts Much Attention". Buffalo Courier. Buffalo, New York. 1916 – via Newspapers.com.
