= USCGC Bramble =

Icebreaker launched in 1944

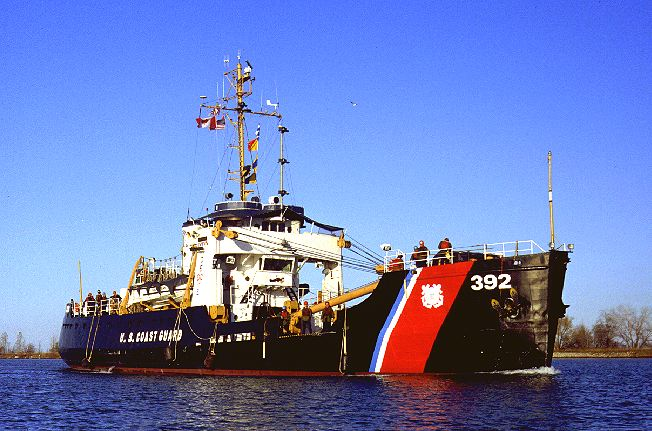
- USCGC Bramble

History

United States
- Name: Bramble
- Builder: Zenith Dredge Company, Duluth, Minnesota
- Cost: $925,464
- Yard number: CG-171
- Laid down: 2 August 1943
- Launched: 23 October 1943
- Commissioned: 22 April 1944
- Decommissioned: 22 May 2003
- Identification: IMO number: 8635033; MMSI number: 367741850; Callsign: WDI8756
- Nickname(s): The Thorn of the Great Lakes; Arctic Aristocrats; The Bumble
- Fate: Scrapped 2023
- Notes: The USCG call sign of Bramble was NODK.

General characteristics
- Class & type: Class C or Iris-class seagoing buoy tenders
- Displacement: 1,025 long tons (1,041 t)
- Length: 180 ft (54.9 m) oa.
- Beam: 37 ft (11.3 m) mb.
- Draft: 12 ft (3.7 m) (1945); 13 ft 11 in (4.2 m) (1962)
- Propulsion: 2 × General Motors EMD 645 V8 diesel engines
- Speed: 13 knots (24 km/h; 15 mph)
- Range: 8,000 nmi (15,000 km; 9,200 mi) at 13 kn (24 km/h; 15 mph)
- Complement: 6 officers, 74 enlisted (1945); 3 officers, 2 warrant officers, 42 enlisted (1962)
- Sensors & processing systems: Radar: SL-1 (1945). Sonar WEA (1945)
- Armament: Wartime : 1 × 3 in (76 mm) gun; 20 mm guns; Depth charges; Peacetime : Small arms
- USCGC Bramble
- Formerly listed on the U.S. National Register of Historic Places
- Location: 2336 Military St. Port Huron, Michigan
- Coordinates: 42°57′36″N 82°25′32″W
- NRHP reference No.: 12000457

Significant dates
- Added to NRHP: 1 August 2012
- Removed from NRHP: 2 December 2024

USCGC Bramble (WLB-392) was one of the 39 original 180-foot (55 m) seagoing buoy tenders built between 1942 and 1944 for the United States Coast Guard. In commission from 1944 until 2003 she saw service in Pacific, Caribbean and Atlantic waters as well as the Great Lakes. In 1947 Bramble was present at the Nuclear testing at Bikini Atoll and in 1957 a circumnavigation of North America involved a forced traverse of the Northwest Passage. After decommissioning in 2003 Bramble became a museum ship in Port Huron, Michigan. In 2018 she was sold to a private owner, who announced plans to repeat her historic 1957 circumnavigation of North America. The new owner ran out of funds, and the ship was scrapped in 2023.

== Design and construction ==
The ship was built by the Zenith Dredge Company in Duluth, Minnesota. Bramble's preliminary design was completed by the United States Lighthouse Service and the final design was produced by Marine Iron and Shipbuilding Corporation in Duluth. On 2 August 1943 the keel was laid, she was launched on 23 October 1943 and commissioned on 22 April 1944. The original cost for the hull and machinery was $925,464.

== Service history ==
=== 1944–1957 ===
In the spring on 1945, she departed the Great Lakes to her first homeport of San Pedro, California, to perform aids to navigation duties. Later that year, Bramble was transferred to Juneau, Alaska, for supply and aids to navigation work around the Aleutian Islands.

After World War II, Bramble's homeport was changed to San Francisco. Except for a brief stay in Hawaii in 1946, she remained assigned to San Francisco until 1949. From July to October 1947, Bramble participated in "Operation Crossroads", the first test of an atomic bomb's effect on surface ships, at Bikini Island.

In 1949 Bramble was reassigned to San Juan, Puerto Rico and moved again in 1953 to Miami, Florida. About this time renewed interest in the Northwest Passage brought about another mission for Bramble.

=== Northwest Passage, 1957 ===
The Coast Guard Cutters Bramble, USCGC Spar and USCGC Storis were selected to attempt a forced passage along the northern shore of Canada from the Pacific to the Atlantic Ocean. Preparations for the difficult voyage included fitting Bramble with a stainless steel propeller and strengthening her bow to withstand tremendous pressures created by the Arctic ice pack. Bramble departed for this historic adventure from Miami on 24 May 1957 en route Seattle, Washington via the Panama Canal. On 1 July 1957 the task force departed Seattle for the Atlantic via the Bering Strait and Arctic Ocean. The ships traveled through 4,500 nautical miles (8,330 km) of semi-charted water in 64 days to recross the Arctic Circle into the Atlantic. The success of the mission distinguished the three cutters as the first American surface ships to circumnavigate the North American continent. On 2 December 1957 Bramble returned to Miami.

=== 1957–1985 ===
In 1962 Bramble transferred to Detroit, Michigan to perform the missions of aids to navigation, search and rescue, icebreaking and law enforcement throughout the Great Lakes. Bramble completed a major renovation and overhaul in 1974, during which her engines were removed and rebuilt and her berthing areas were expanded and modernized. A new hydraulic boom was also installed.

Upon completion of the major renovation in September 1975, Bramble reported to Port Huron, Michigan. In addition to her normal duties, Bramble was involved in some unique missions. She frequently served as the Patrol Commander for the Port Huron-to-Mackinac sailboat race. This race started in 1925 and is one of the largest freshwater sailboat races in the country, with an average of 300 boats competing each year. Bramble also set buoys for the International Freedom Festival in the Detroit River.

=== 1986–1998 ===
From December 1986 to April 1987, Bramble performed law enforcement duties in the Caribbean. Bramble was involved in six cases during which one vessel was seized, three persons arrested and 50 tons of marijuana confiscated.

From June to November 1989, Bramble again underwent major renovations in Toledo, Ohio. Her original engines were replaced with General Motors electromotive Division EMD-645 V-8 diesel engines. New 200 kW ship's service generators, boilers, associated plumbing and electrical cable were also part of the project.

1994 marked the Golden (50th) Anniversary of Bramble's commissioning, along with her Great Lakes sister ships USCGC Acacia, homeported in Charlevoix, Michigan, and USCGC Sundew, homeported in Duluth, Minnesota.

From December 1997 to April 1998 the Bramble was involved in "Operation Snowbird." This took the cutter to the Caribbean, where the main mission was to help train marine police of ten eastern Caribbean nations. While there, the crew also performed work on aids to navigation and participated with Venezuela in a joint law enforcement operation. During this operation Bramble steamed over 12,165 miles.

=== 1998–2003 ===
Aids to navigation was Bramble's primary mission; aids to navigation assist the merchant fleet and private vessels in safely navigating waterways. Bramble's area of responsibility included eastern Lake Erie, southern Lake Huron and Saginaw Bay. Bramble was responsible for maintaining 187 buoys, 1 NOAA weather buoy, and three fog signals. During winter months Bramble's capabilities as an icebreaker enabled her to escort ships through the ice, assist ships in distress and break ice for relief.

Bramble primarily deployed twice a year for buoy operations. In late fall or early winter, Bramble spent between eight-ten weeks "buoy decommissioning" – removing buoys and installing temporary winter marks (small buoys not normally damaged by ice). During this period approximately 101 lighted buoys would be decommissioned. Then, starting in early spring as the lake ice season began to subside, Bramble started the eight-ten week "buoy commissioning" season to replace winter marks with regular buoys. Along with commissioning the buoys, there were approximately 86 unlighted aids that had to be serviced and inspected in the spring. Her winter months were normally spent, when not icebreaking, undergoing maintenance and training; her summer months were usually spent in regularly scheduled drydock or dockside availabilities, training conferences and festival celebrations throughout the lakes.

With new technology evolving, the new 225-foot (69 m) Juniper-class cutters began to replace the 180s'. The new cutters have the primary mission of buoy tending, but also are able to perform multiple missions like their predecessor. The 225's also are able to help with environmental cleanups, search and rescue, law enforcement and icebreaking.

On 22 May 2003, Bramble was decommissioned. Her replacement was the Juniper-class cutter USCGC Hollyhock.

=== Awards ===
Throughout Bramble's service it was awarded many awards and ribbons. She received the Department of Transportation Gold Medal, CG Unit Commendation, CG Meritorious Unit Commendation, CG "E" Ribbon, CG Bicentennial Unit Commendation, American Campaign Medal, WWII Victory Ribbon, National Defense Service Medal, Arctic Service Medal and the Special Operations Service Ribbon.

== Museum ship ==
After decommissioning, Bramble became a museum ship, docked at the Seaway Terminal, donated to the Port Huron Museum, but closed to the public in 2011 due to lack of funding. In August 2012 she was listed on the National Register of Historic Places. In January 2013 the ship was purchased by Robert B Klingler of Marine City, Michigan, who created the company USCGC Bramble LLC. Some restoration was carried out and the ship continued as a museum, also making occasional short voyages. Bramble was used as the basis for the White Portuguese ship featured in Batman v Superman: Dawn of Justice.

== Future expedition and auction ==
In December 2018 Bramble was sold to Tom Clarke of Roanoke, Virginia. He announced plans to send the vessel to a Mobile, Alabama shipyard in Spring 2019 to prepare her for a voyage from Miami, replicating the circumnavigation of North America in 1957, including traverse of the North West Passage. This plan was cancelled as Bramble's new owner ran out of funds, and the ship was taken from him to be auctioned off in Mobile, Alabama. On 4 December 2019 the Bramble was sold at public auction by the United States Marshals Service for $80,000 to M.A.R.S., Modern American Recycling Services, Inc. The Bramble was scrapped in Mobile, Alabama in 2023. The ship was removed from the National Register of Historic Places in 2024.
