= USCGC Mesquite =

Seagoing buoy tender scuttled in Lake Superior

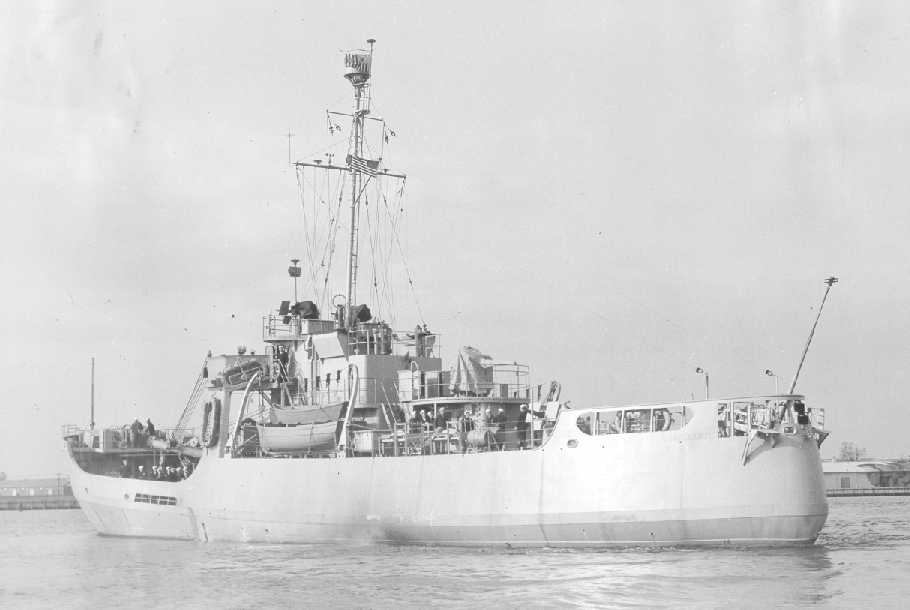
- USCGC Mesquite in World War II

History

United States
- Builder: Marine Ironworks & Shipbuilding Corporation, Duluth, Minnesota
- Cost: $874,798
- Laid down: 20 August 1942
- Launched: 14 November 1942
- Commissioned: 27 August 1943
- Decommissioned: January 31, 1990
- Identification: Signal letters NRPW
- Fate: Ran aground December 4, 1989; scuttled for underwater diving preserve 1990

General characteristics as built in 1942
- Class & type: Mesquite
- Displacement: 935 tons
- Length: 180 ft (55 m)
- Beam: 37 ft (11 m)
- Draft: 12 feet (3.7 m)
- Propulsion: 2 × Cooper-Bessemer GN8 diesel engines
- Speed: 13 kn (24 km/h; 15 mph)
- Range: 8,000 nmi (15,000 km; 9,200 mi) at 13 kn (24 km/h; 15 mph)
- Complement: 6 officers and 74 enlisted
- Armament: 2 x 20 mm guns, 3-inch gun, and depth charges.

USCGC Mesquite (WAGL/WLB-305) was the lead ship in the Mesquite class of seagoing buoy tenders operated by the United States Coast Guard. She served in the Pacific during World War II, and spent the rest of her Coast Guard career in the Great Lakes. She ran aground and was wrecked in December 1989 off the Keweenaw Peninsula in Lake Superior. She was scuttled nearby as a recreational diving attraction.

== Construction and characteristics ==
Mesquite was built at the Marine Ironworks and Shipbuilding Company yard in Duluth, Minnesota. Her keel was laid down on August 20, 1942. The ship was launched on November 14, 1942. She was christened by Mrs. Jessie L. Tyler, wife of Lieutenant Commander Gaines A. Tyler, chief inspector for the Coast Guard at the Duluth shipyard. Her original cost was $874,798.

Her hull was constructed of welded steel plates framed with steel I-beams. As originally built, Mesquite was 180 feet (55 m) long, with a beam of 37 feet (11 m), and a draft of 12 feet (3.7 m). Her displacement was 935 tons. While her overall dimensions remained the same over her career, the addition of new equipment raised her displacement to 1,025 tons by the end of her Coast Guard service.

She was designed to perform light ice-breaking. Her hull was reinforced with an "ice belt" of thicker steel around her waterline to protect it from punctures. Similarly, her bow was reinforced and shaped to ride over ice in order to crush it with the weight of the ship. In 1968 Mesquite was fitted with an experimental "sea plow" called the "Alexbow" to enhance her icebreaking capabilities. This device was 66 feet (20 m) long, 26 feet (7.9 m) wide, and 9 feet (2.7 m) tall. It was attached by cables to the ship's bow which fit into a v-notch at the plow's stern. There were a number of problems with the experimental device and the design was not adopted by the Coast Guard.

Mesquite had a single 8.5 feet (2.6 m) stainless-steel five-blade propeller driven by a diesel-electric propulsion system. Two Cooper-Bessemer GND-8 4-cycle 8-cylinder Diesel engines produced 700 horsepower each. They provided power to two Westinghouse generators. The electricity from the generators ran a 1200 horsepower Westinghouse electric motor which turned the propeller.

She had a single cargo boom which had the ability to lift 20 tons onto her buoy deck.

The ship's fuel tanks had a capacity of approximately 28,875 US gallons (109,300 L). Mesquite's unrefueled range was 8,000 nautical miles (15,000 km) at 13 knots, 12,000 nautical miles (22,000 km) at 12 knots, and 17,000 nautical miles (31,000 km) at 8.3 knots. Her potable water tanks had a capacity of 30,499 US gallons (115,450 L). Considering dry storage capacity and other factors, her at-sea endurance was 21 days.

Her wartime complement was 6 officers and 74 enlisted men. By 1964 this was reduced to 5 officers, 2 warrant officers, and 42 enlisted personnel.

Mesquite was armed with a 3"/50 caliber gun mounted behind the pilot house. She also had two 20mm guns, one mounted on top of the wheelhouse and one on the aft deck. Two racks of depth charges were also mounted on the aft deck. All of this armament was removed when she returned to the Great Lakes in 1947. The Rush-Bagot Treaty with Canada had largely demilitarized the lakes leaving Mesquite with only small arms for law enforcement actions.

At the time of construction, Mesquite was designated WAGL, an auxiliary vessel, lighthouse tender. The designation was system was changed in 1965, and she was redesignated WLB, an oceangoing buoy tender. Her namesake is the Mesquite tree of the southwest United States.

== World War II service ==
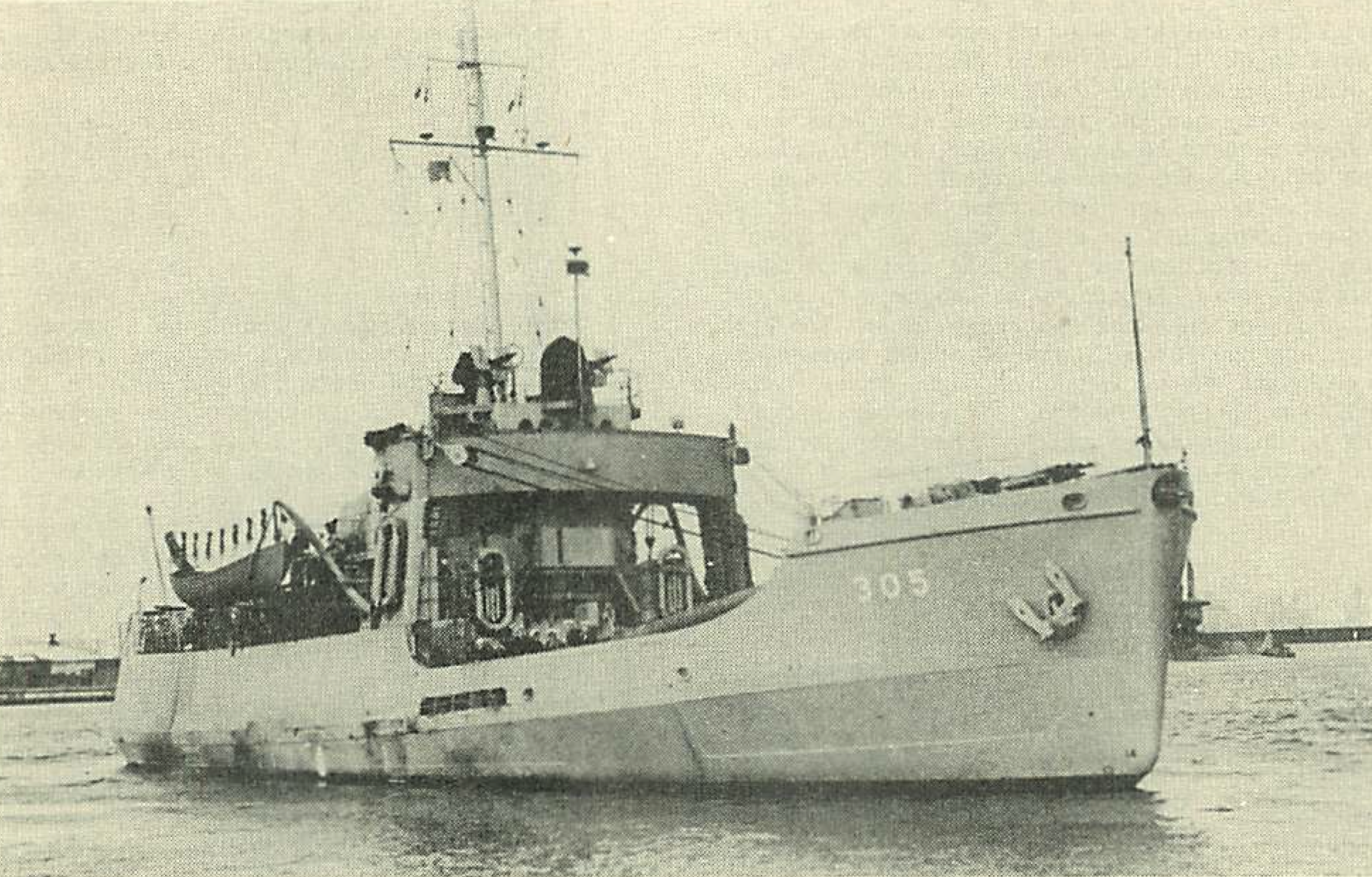
Mesquite during World War II

Upon the completion of her fitting out and sea trials, Mesquite sailed from Duluth to the Coast Guard Yard at Curtis Bay, Maryland to have her armament and sensors installed. She was commissioned there on August 27, 1943. Her first, brief assignment was to the Coast Guard's 5th District, which was responsible for the mid-Atlantic coast. Within a month she was slated for service in the Pacific and began a series of training exercises to prepare. Mesquite sailed through the Panama Canal arriving at Brisbane, Australia on February 29, 1944. She reached Milne Bay in New Guinea on April 16, 1944.

Mesquite was engaged in placing and maintaining aids to navigation in the Milne Bay Area for two months. On June 19, 1944 she arrived at Wakde Island less than a month after it was taken from the Japanese. She placed buoys in the area for two months and then moved on to Manus Island once again placing and maintaining buoys and other aids to navigation. By July 16, 1945 Mesquite was buoy tending in the Philippines. She spent the next year maintaining aids to navigation in the Philippines. She sailed back to the United States via Guam, and Hawaii, arriving at San Francisco on August 12, 1947.

== Great Lakes service ==
After returning from the Pacific, Mesquite's first home port was Sault Ste Marie, Michigan, where she arrived on December 5, 1947. Her primary mission was maintaining aids to navigation. Much of her activity was driven by the annual advance and retreat of heavy winter ice on the Great Lakes. Buoys were brought to port in the fall to prevent them from being damaged, sunk, or set adrift by ice. Buoys were cleaned, repaired, and repainted over the winter and redeployed by the ship in the spring.

Her second mission was icebreaking, a service she performed throughout her career. One aspect of her icebreaking work was to free ships that became trapped in the ice. In April 1960, for example, the tankers Edward G. Seubert and Clark Milwaukee became frozen-in on their way to Green Bay. Mesquite cut a track into the port, widened it, and then broke the ice near the immobilized ships to allow them to move into the broken track. The entire round trip from Green Bay, including breaking out the two tankers took nine hours. A second icebreaking role was to escort ships through the ice, breaking a channel for the ship following her. Mesquite was engaged on this task on April 18, 1958 when she led three Canada Steamship Lines ships through the ice in Whitefish Bay. A third icebreaking activity was to clear shipping lanes for future ship traffic. Mesquite cleared ice in the Straits of Mackinac, Lake Michigan, and the St. Clair River. She also participated in "Operation Oil Can" over several winters. This program engaged several cutters in icebreaking channels for tankers transporting fuel to Great Lakes ports.

Mesquite participated in numerous search and rescue missions. For example, in November 1956 the 7,300-ton freighter J.P. Wells lost her rudder in a storm with 30-foot seas. Mesquite steamed out into Lake Superior to render assistance. She was able to get lines across to the disabled ship twice, but both parted. She radioed for help and together with USCGC Mackinaw was able to tow J.P. Wells to Sault Ste. Marie for repairs. In 1963 Mesquite and a tug towed the grounded freighter Exiria off the rocks. She was laden with 500 tons of cheese embarked at Green Bay. In August of that year the ship rescued a family of five whose sailboat had been wrecked on an uninhabited island. In September 1974, Mesquite rescued five people aboard a small powerboat that had been adrift for two days with engine problems and a dead battery. She not only rescued the passengers, but also craned the boat up on to the buoy deck before heading back to port.

Mesquite was pressed into service as a fire-fighter several times in her career. Perhaps the most dramatic case occurred in January 1973. The port engine on the tanker Venus exploded and caught fire, killing one of her engineers. Mesquite went to the ship's aid and was able to extinguish the engine room fire in a matter of hours. She earned the Coast Guard Unit Commendation for this event.

In 1959 Mesquite was assigned to Sturgeon Bay, Wisconsin. She replaced USCGC Hollyhock (WAGL-220) there. Her career at Sturgeon Bay was similar to that at Sault Ste. Marie with the seasonal removal and replacement of buoys, frequent calls for ice breaking over the winter, and the occasional vessel in distress. On April 10, 1964, though, it was Mesquite that needed a rescue. She was placing buoys at the beginning of spring, as she had for years. That year, however, Lake Michigan was at an unusually low level. At 11 am Mesquite went aground on Eleven-Foot Shoal in Green Bay and ripped a twelve-foot gash in her hull. The flooding reached five feet deep in her engine room and shut down the ship's engines and generators. The tug sent to pull her off the reef went aground, too, another victim of low water levels. Mesquite's crew placed a temporary patch on the hull to stop the flooding, so there was no danger of sinking. USCGC Sundew arrived on scene the next day and towed the tug off the reef. Then the two ships cooperated in towing Mesquite free. Mesquite went into dry dock at Sturgeon Bay for repairs.

In 1972, USCGC Woodbine, based in Grand Haven, Michigan, was decommissioned. Mesquite was assigned responsibility for Woodbine's fleet of buoys. She also inherited some of Woodbine's equipment.

In June 1976 she sailed for Portland, Maine. Mesquite's crew was transferred to the newly renovated USCGC Acacia at Curtis Bay. They sailed their new ship back to Sturgeon Bay where Acacia replaced Mesquite. Meanwhile, Mesquite went into the Coast Guard Yard for her own renovation. Her engines were overhauled and a bow thruster was added to improve the ship's maneuverability.

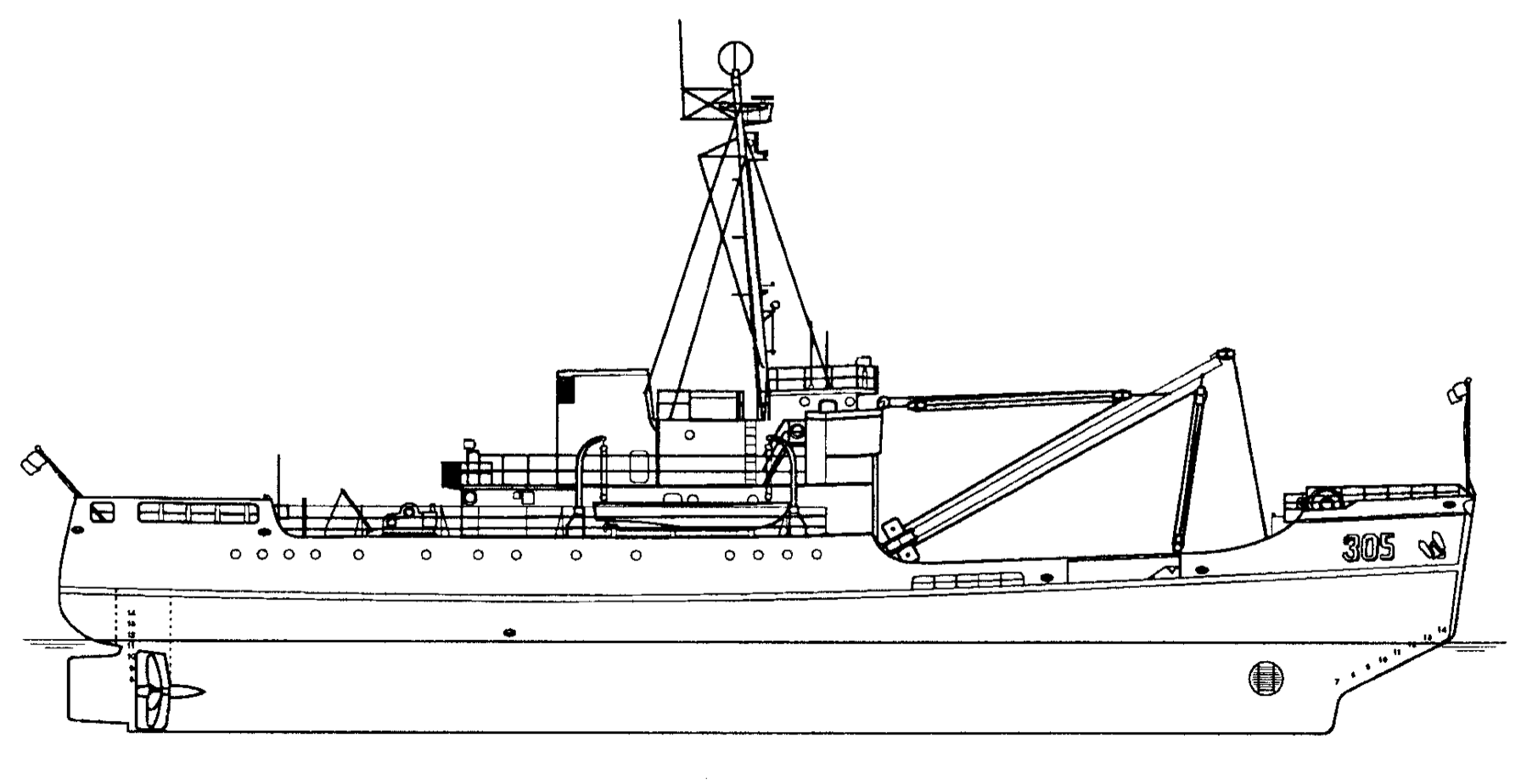
Mesquite after 1977 renovation

At the completion of the work in the fall of 1977, Mesquite took on the crew of USCGC Sundew, which was entering the Coast Guard Yard for her renovation cycle. They sailed the ship back to Sundew's old homeport, Charlevoix, Michigan. The juggling of ships and crews continued in 1978 as the Coast Guards buoy tender renovation program progressed. USCGC Woodrush was due for renovation, so her crew was swapped with Mesquite's. Mesquite sailed for Duluth to replace Woodrush. In June 1980 Mesquite was ordered back to Charlevoix, and traded crews with Sundew which was home-ported in Duluth. This was Mesquite's last change of home ports.

In 1984, in cooperation with U.S. Fish and Wildlife Service hatcheries and the Michigan Department of Natural Resources, Mesquite released 210,000 lake trout fingerlings on offshore reefs in Lake Michigan. It was hoped that fish released in the middle of the lake would have a higher survival rate than those released along the shore. In another cooperative venture, Mesquite set and retrieved weather buoys for NOAA.

On November 26, 1984 Mesquite sailed from Charlevoix bound for Grenada. Operation Urgent Fury, the United States invasion of Grenada had been launched the previous month. She reached Grenada on December 25, 1984 via Halifax, Bermuda, and San Juan. Her primary mission was law enforcement patrols, but it became clear her services were not needed in Grenada. She headed back to Miami about February 1, 1985. She participated in a number of drug seizures and humanitarian missions while in Florida waters. She met USCGC Gallatin towing a 35 feet (11 m) fishing boat loaded with 20,400 pounds (9,300 kg) of marijuana, which she had seized. Mesquite took up the tow, and turned the contraband and the six-man crew over to law enforcement authorities in Miami. She returned to Charlevoix on April 7, 1985, just in time to begin her usual task of resetting buoys in the spring. The ship also deployed to Florida waters during the winter of 1988–1989 for law enforcement duties. She boarded twenty vessels while on patrol. She arrived back in Charlevoix on April 5, 1989, in time to replace her buoys.

== Loss of Mesquite ==
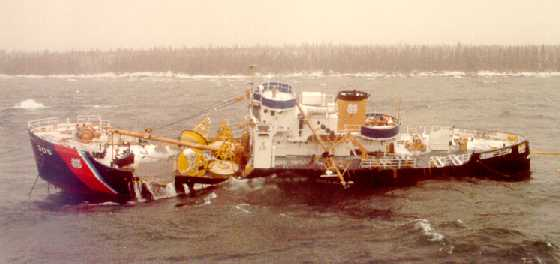
Mesquite aground on her final voyage

By the late 1980s the World War II-vintage buoy tender fleet on the Great Lakes had become mechanically unreliable. Coast Guard budget constraints sometimes slowed or deferred needed maintenance. It became common for ships to service not only their own fleet of buoys, but those of broken-down buoy tenders as well. At various times Mesquite was assigned to take care of buoys for Acacia, Bramble, and Sundew. Commandant of the Coast Guard Admiral Paul A. Yost, Jr. characterized this practice as "somewhat dangerous". Since buoys often mark shoals, rocks, and other hazards to navigation, tending buoys necessarily brings a cutter close to these dangers. When tending buoys assigned to a different cutter, the lack of previous experience can increase the risk.

The higher risk became manifest in December 1989. Mesquite began her usual duties picking up her buoys before advancing ice could damage them. USCGC Sundew was late coming out of shipyard repairs, so Mesquite was once again tasked with removing some of her buoys as well. Mesquite picked up 25 of her buoys and headed to Lake Superior to pick up Sundew's. She retrieved at least 35 before she pulled the light buoy which marked the shoal off Keweenaw Point. With the buoy aboard, she got underway. At approximately 2:10 am on December 4, 1989 she ran onto the shoal and went aground. The hull was pierced, but the pumps were able to keep pace with the incoming water. Wind and waves were moderate, but enough to pound the ship on the rocks. After three hours, the flooding became uncontrollable. The captain ordered Mesquite abandoned at 6:17 am and the crew was safely evacuated. Three suffered minor injuries. The crew was taken aboard a passing cargo vessel, Mangal Desai, which had responded to Mesquite's distress calls.

USCGC Acacia, USCGC Katmai Bay, and CCGS Samuel Risley responded to the scene. Up to 1,800 feet (550 m) of oil containment boom was deployed to capture a diesel fuel leak from Mesquite. High winds and waves up to 10 feet (3.0 m) battered the grounded ship on December 8 and 9, damaging the hull further, tearing off her rudder, and toppling her mast. The Coast Guard concluded at this point that the ship could not be salvaged in winter conditions. Instead, efforts were made to pump off the remaining fuel, salvage high value equipment, and seal the ship for the winter. On January 4, 1990 the Coast Guard announced that it would decommission Mesquite on January 31, 1990. Her damage was so great that it would not be worth attempting to restore her to service.

The captain of Mesquite chose to stand for court-martial after the grounding, rather than resign. In September 1990 he was found guilty of hazarding his vessel, but was acquitted of dereliction of duty. In January 1991, the appeal of his conviction was rejected.

=== Causes ===
Investigations subsequent to the loss of Mesquite identified a number of factors which may have contributed to the grounding. The crew of Mesquite had never tended this buoy before and thus was not familiar with the area. It was a dark, overcast night, eliminating any visual references. GPS was unavailable, LORAN was inaccurate, radar was insufficiently precise, other navigational aids in the area were unlit, and the chart of the area had an inappropriate scale. In short, it was difficult to tell precisely where the ship was in relation to the shoal. The bright lights on the buoy deck hurt the crew's night vision. There was no lookout posted on the flying bridge who might have seen or heard waves breaking on the shoal. The officer of the deck failed to confirm the ship's location before getting underway and the captain failed to review the officer's work.

Additional issues were identified as potentially preventing the ship from promptly refloating after the grounding. The ship was not aggressively lightened. Fifty tons of fresh water were not pumped overboard. She retained her anchors and chain as well as the 7 tons of buoys she had recovered. Only a limited attempt was made to back off the shoal and the bow thruster was not used. Some of the crew exhibited signs of panic.

== Salvage and sinking ==
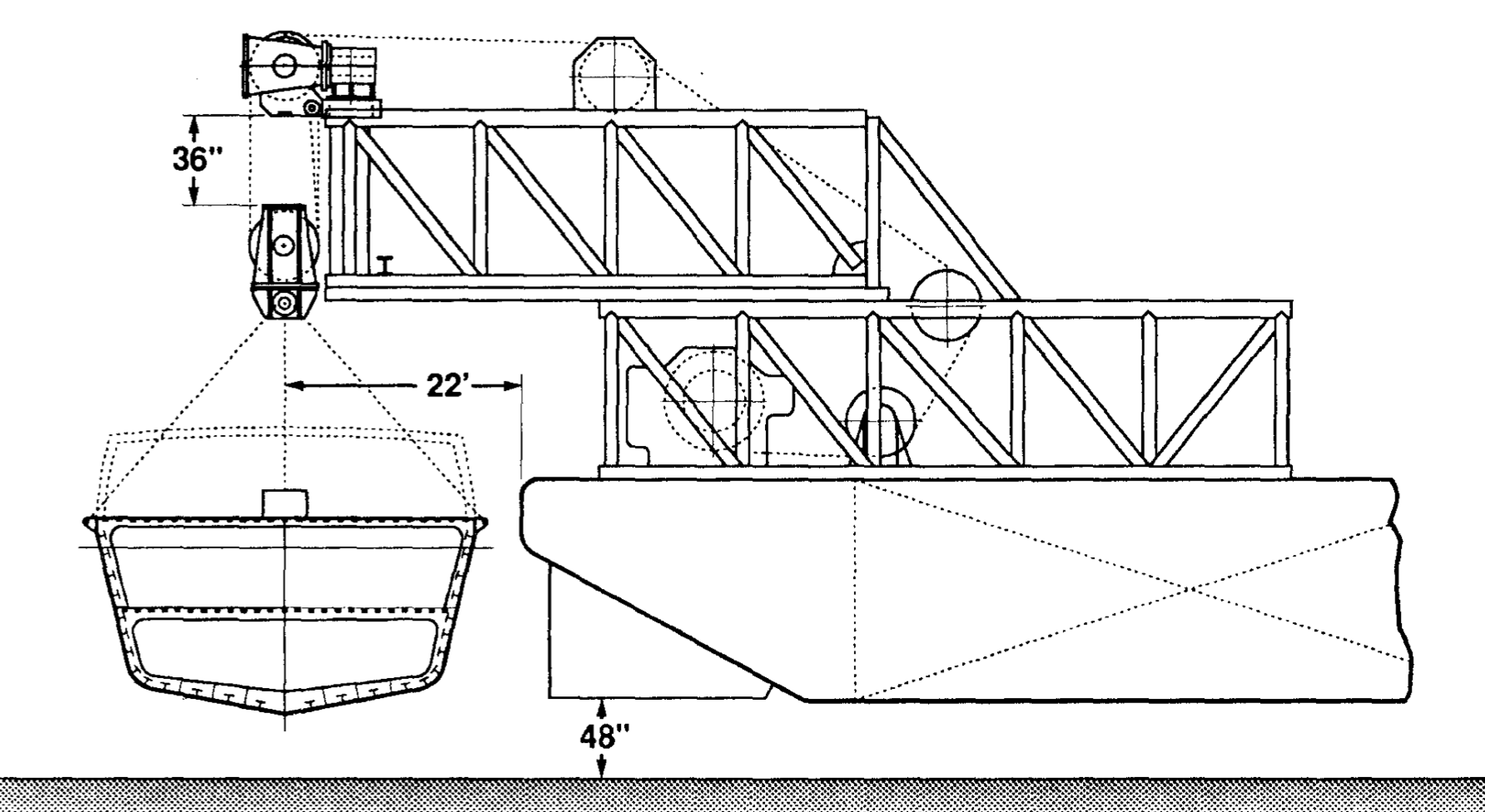
Raising configuration of heavy-lift barge and Mesquite

The Coast Guard believed that storms and ice would break-up the stranded Mesquite, transforming her into an environmental and navigational hazard. It determined to remove her during the summer of 1990 while the ship was mostly intact. There were three options considered for the hulk after it was removed from the shoal. First, it could be scrapped. Second, it could be repaired and returned to service, but at an estimated cost of $44 million, this option was quickly discarded. Third, it could be scuttled not far from the grounding and become a recreational diving attraction.

There were several issues with the diving proposal, all of which revolved around liability. There were concerns that fuel, oil, or other toxic substances would leak from the wreck. There were concerns that lawsuits might result from divers injured on the wreck. The Keweenaw Bay Indian Community was concerned that the wreck would interfere with fish spawning. The Coast Guard was not willing to shoulder this liability, as recreational diving sites are not part of its mission. Secretary of Transportation Samuel Skinner, who supervised the Coast Guard, offered to donate the wreck to the State of Michigan in April 1990, but the state had its own concerns about liability. An agreement was struck in early May 1990 and Mesquite was donated to the Michigan Department of Natural Resources for the proposed Keweenaw Underwater Preserve as an attraction for recreational divers.

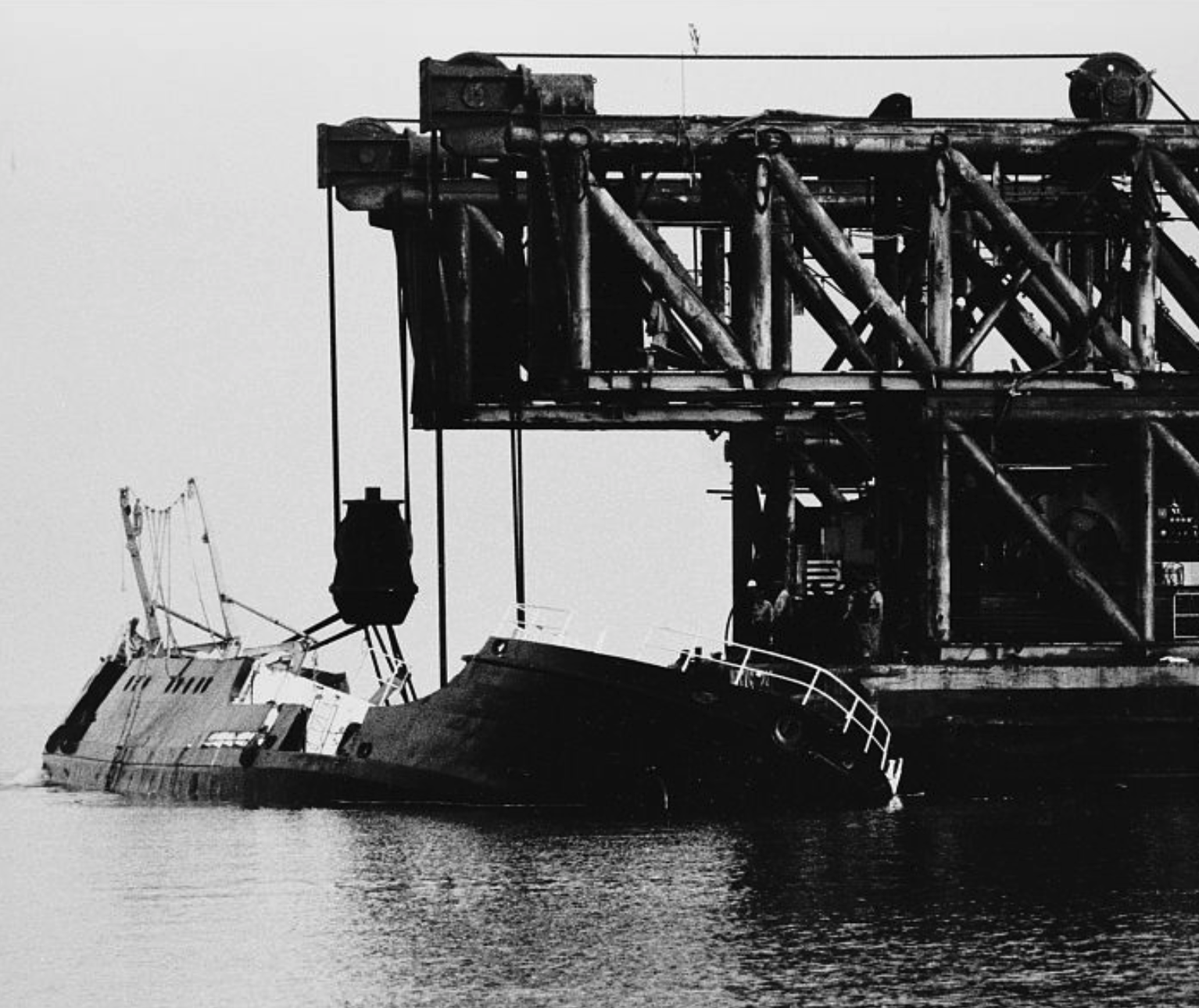
Mesquite being lowered into Lake Superior

After the storm of December 8 and 9, 1989, salvors concluded that she could not be patched, pumped out, and refloated. The wreck would have to be lifted off the shoal and carried to her sinking site. To achieve this lift, a barge was chartered and a pair of lowering trusses originally used by Shell Oil for platform construction at its COGNAC oil field in the Gulf of Mexico were mounted on it. The heavy-lift barge was towed from Port Newark, New Jersey to Lake Superior during May 1990.

In preparation for scuttling, salvors stripped Mesquite of valuable parts, including the propeller, cargo boom, and anchor windlass which the Coast Guard wanted for its stores. Much loose material was hauled off. Most of the superstructure was cut away. Remaining fuel, oil, paint, and other toxic material was removed. Flooded compartments of the ship were either pumped out or blown out with compressed air to reduce the wreck's weight. Finally, on July 14, 1990 Mesquite was lifted off its ledge. When her full weight was carried by the trusses, the heavy-lift barge had less than 6 inches (15 cm) of clearance to the bottom of the lake. After Mesquite was off the bottom, the wreck and barge were winched out of the shallow water. Once clear of the shoal, they were towed to the sinking site about 1.5 miles (2.4 km) away in Keystone Bay. The wreck was lowered to the bottom in 117 feet (36 m) of water. The total cost of the removal process was approximately $2 million.

== Legacy ==
The Coast Guard reassigned Acacia to Charlevoix, Michigan to replace Mesquite. There was no replacement cutter for Acacia, however, reducing the number of buoy tenders in the Great Lakes from five to four. The Coast Guard justified the move based on cost savings, but others attributed it to the influence of U.S. Representative Bob Davis, who represented Charlevoix in Congress. He was vice-chairman of the House Merchant Marine and Fisheries Committee which had jurisdiction over the Coast Guard. The move left ill-feeling in Grand Haven, Acacia's previous base.

The Keweenaw Underwater Preserve was created and Mesquite became one of its most popular attractions for recreational divers. Not all were respectful, and the ship was stripped of many artifacts shortly after she was scuttled. Artifacts from the Mesquite are on display at the Maritime Museum at Eagle Harbor Lighthouse in Eagle Harbor Michigan.
