= SS Sir Trevor Dawson =

Canadian bulk carrier

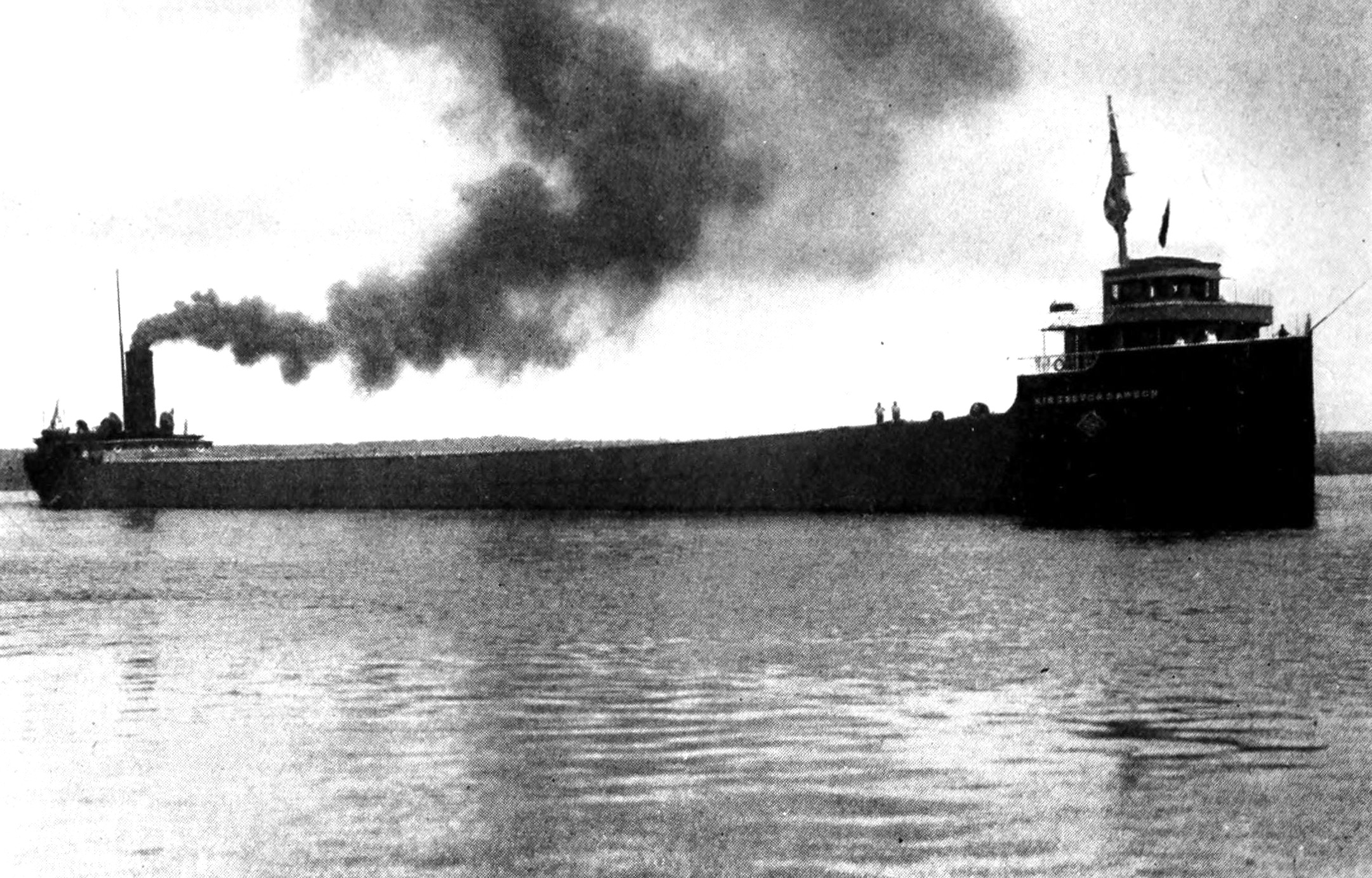

History
- Name: Sir Trevor Dawson (1916–1920); Charles L. Hutchinson (1920–1951); Gene C. Hutchinson (1951–1962); Parkdale (1962–1970)
- Namesake: Trevor Dawson
- Operator: American Interlake Company (1916–1920); Pioneer Steamship Company (1920–1951); Redwood Enterprises Ltd. (1951–1970)
- Port of registry: (United States) Duluth, Minnesota (1916–1932); (United States) Wilmington, Delaware (1932–1962); Hamilton, Bermuda (1962–1967); (Canada) Hamilton, Ontario (1967–1970)
- Builder: Superior Shipbuilding Company, Superior, Wisconsin
- Yard number: 524
- Launched: September 9, 1916
- In service: 1916
- Out of service: 1970
- Identification: U.S. Registry #214499
- Fate: Scrapped in 1970, in Cartagena, Spain

General characteristics
- Class & type: Bulk freighter
- Tonnage: 7,514 GRT; 5,803 NRT
- Length: 600 ft (180 m)
- Beam: 58 ft (18 m)
- Height: 32 ft (9.8 m)
- Installed power: 2 x Scotch marine boilers
- Propulsion: 2,000 hp (1,500 kW) triple expansion steam engine attached to a single fixed pitch propeller
- Speed: 11 knots (20 km/h; 13 mph)
- Capacity: 12,000 tons
- Crew: 25

Sir Trevor Dawson was an American-built Canadian bulk carrier that operated from 1916 to 1970 on the Great Lakes. She was launched on September 9, 1916 as hull #524. She was built by the Superior Shipbuilding Company of Superior, Wisconsin using the stern of the wrecked bulk freighter William C. Moreland. She was powered by a 2,000-horsepower (1,500 kW) triple expansion steam engine, supplied by two coal-fired Scotch marine boilers. The Sir Trevor Dawson's first owner was the American Interlake Company. Her homeport was Duluth, Minnesota. She entered service in December 1916 carrying a load of grain to Duluth.

== New name and a new company ==
On December 16, 1920 Sir Trevor Dawson was sold to the Pioneer Steamship Company of Cleveland, Ohio. Later that year she was renamed Charles L. Hutchinson. The Charles L. Hutchinson stranded on the Keweenaw Peninsula on October 31, 1925 (near where the William C Moreland wrecked). She was removed by the wrecking tugs Favorite and Iowa. In 1932 she was re-registered to Wilmington, Delaware. She was renamed Gene C. Hutchinson in 1951. In 1962 the Gene C. Hutchinson was sold to Redwood Enterprises Ltd. of Port Credit and renamed Parkdale.

== Tow to Spain ==
In 1970 Parkdale was sold to the Marine Salvage Ltd. of Port Colborne, Ontario. Eventually she was sold to a Spanish scrapyard. On May 12, 1970 she cleared Quebec with the Alexander Leslie, towed by the tug Salvonia. They arrived in Cartagena, Spain on June 8, 1970.

== See also ==
- Sir Trevor Dawson, English managing director of Vickers armaments
