= Dawson baronets =

Baronetcy in the Baronetage of the United Kingdom

There have been two baronetcies created for persons with the surname Dawson, both in the Baronetage of the United Kingdom. One creation is extant as of 2007.

The Dawson Baronetcy, of Edgwarebury in the parish of Edgware in the County of Middlesex, was created in the Baronetage of the United Kingdom on 5 February 1920 for the armaments manufacturer Trevor Dawson. He was Managing Director of Vickers.

The Dawson Baronetcy, of Appleton Roebuck in the County of York, was created in the Baronetage of the United Kingdom on 2 July 1929 for the textile manufacturer Benjamin Dawson. The title became extinct on the death of the second Baronet in 1974.

== Dawson baronets, of Edgwarebury (1920) ==
Escutcheon of the Dawson baronets of Edgwarebury

- Sir (Arthur) Trevor Dawson, 1st Baronet (1866–1931). Dawson served as a junior officer in the Royal Navy and was one of the earliest members of The Castaways' Club serving as Honorary Secretary of the club from 1922 to 1931.
- Sir Hugh Trevor Dawson, 2nd Baronet CBE (1893–1976). Dawson was a Commander in the Royal Navy and like his father a prominent member of The Castaways' Club and was club Chairman from 1960 to 1965. He was with Dawson & Forbes Ltd, investment bankers, and was a director of the British Tyre and Rubber Company between 1924 and 1969 and of Decca Navigator Company between 1945 and 1975.
- Sir (Hugh Halliday) Trevor Dawson, 3rd Baronet (1931–committed suicide by plastic bag 1983). Dawson was a Major in the Scots Guards. He was a merchant banker (chairman) with Arbuthnot Latham & Co.
- Sir Hugh Michael Trevor Dawson, 4th Baronet (1956–2007)
- Sir Nicholas Anthony Trevor Dawson, 5th Baronet (born 1957)

There is no heir to the baronetcy.

== Dawson baronets, of Appleton Roebuck (1929) ==
- Sir Benjamin Dawson, 1st Baronet (1878–1966)
- Sir Lawrence Saville Dawson, 2nd Baronet (1908–1974)
