= Sir Benjamin Dawson, 1st Baronet =

British textile manufacturer

Sir Benjamin Dawson, 1st Baronet, JP (26 September 1878 – 25 September 1966) was a British textile manufacturer.

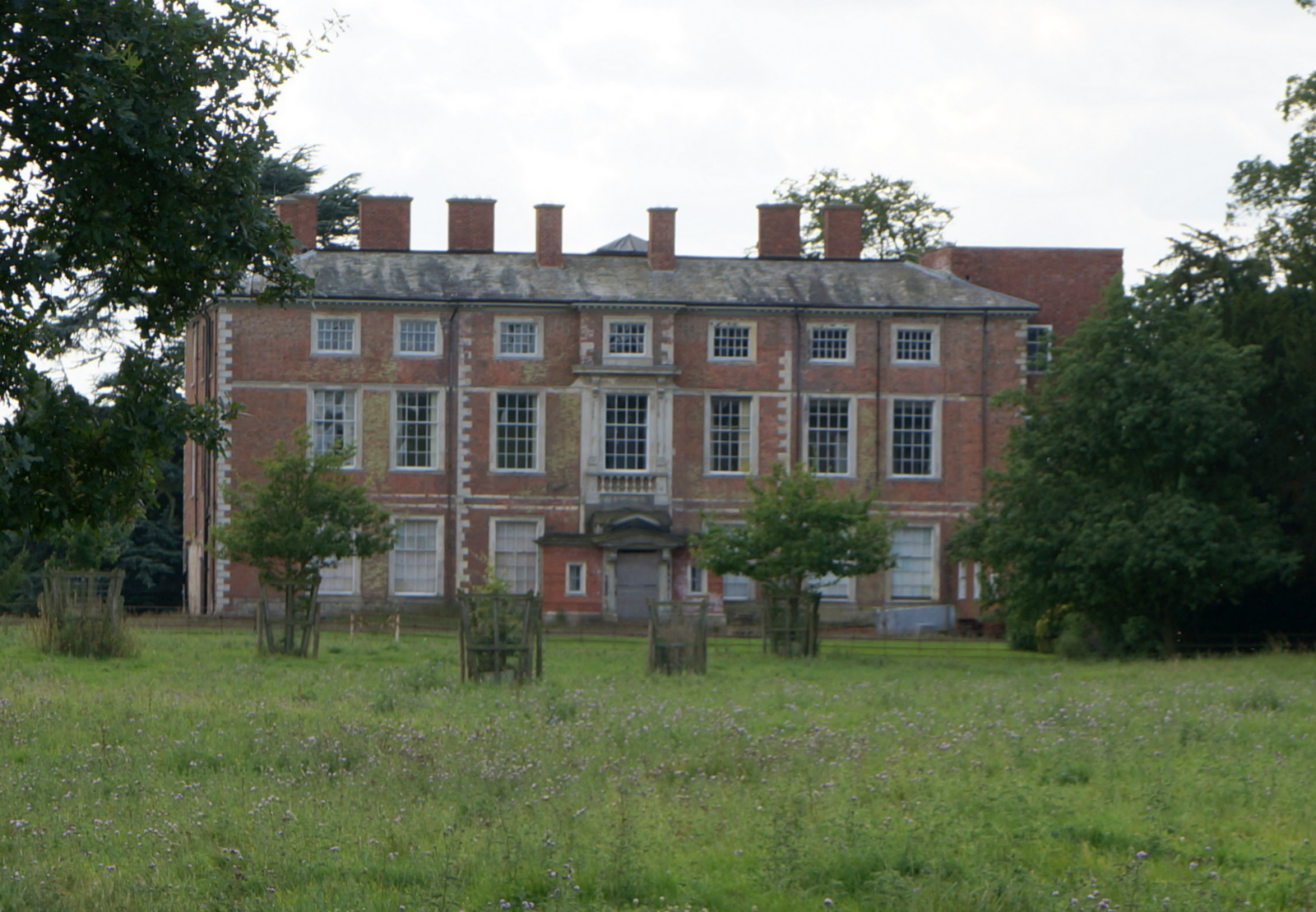
Nun Appleton Hall

He was the son of a textile manufacturer Joseph Dawson of Bradford, West Yorkshire and was educated at Bradford Grammar School. At 15 he worked for his father in the family textile business. He became chairman of Joseph Dawson (Holdings) Ltd. and of Joseph Dawson Ltd., cashmere dehairers, of Cashmere Works, Bradford.

He bought Stackhouse Farm near Settle, where he pioneered the new technique of silage making as a method of animal fodder production. He bought the 1200 acre Nun Appleton estate near York in 1920 and moved into Nun Appleton Hall. He was appointed a Justice of the Peace for the West Riding, created a Baronet of Appleton Roebuck on 2 July 1929 and was High Sheriff of Yorkshire for 1951–52.

He was a Commissioner of the Boy Scouts Association, a member of the Council of Bradford Chamber of Commerce and a member of the Federation of British Industries. He was also active in politics as a Conservative. He was elected vice-commodore of the Royal Yorkshire Yacht Club and was formerly a Member of the York and Ainsty Hunt.

He had married Annie Ellen Saville and was succeeded by their son Sir Lawrence Saville Dawson, 2nd Baronet. Their daughter Joan continued to live at Nun Appleton Hall before selling it.

He is buried in the churchyard of St. John's Church, Acaster Selby.

Baronetage of the United Kingdom
New creation	Baronet (of Appleton Roebuck); 1929–1966	Succeeded by Lawrence Saville Dawson
