= USCGC Acacia (WLB-406) =

Coast Guard ship

Coordinates: 44.259444°N 86.315000°W

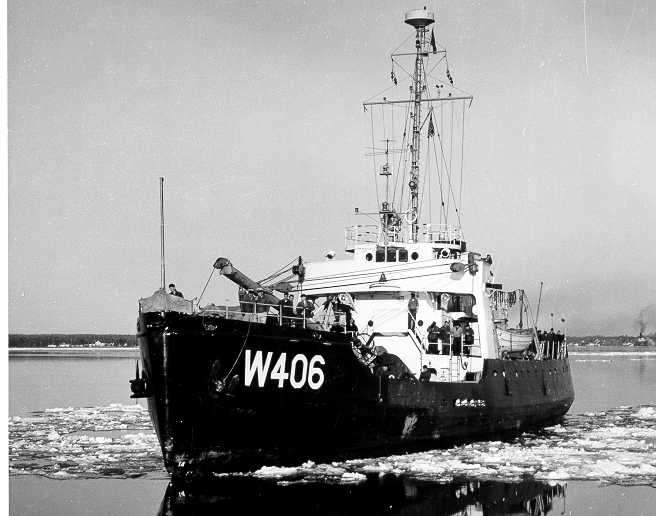
- USCGC Acacia in 1944

History

United States
- Builder: Zenith Dredge Company, Duluth, Minnesota
- Cost: $927,156
- Laid down: 16 January 1944
- Launched: 7 April 1944
- Commissioned: 1 September 1944
- Decommissioned: 7 June 2006
- Identification: Signal letters NODY; IMO number: 8635021
- Motto: Ace Of The Lakes
- Status: Museum ship

General characteristics as built in 1944
- Class & type: Iris
- Displacement: 935 tons
- Length: 180 ft (55 m)
- Beam: 37 ft (11 m)
- Draft: 12 feet (3.7 m)
- Propulsion: 2 Cooper-Bessemer GND-8 Diesel engines
- Speed: 14 kn (26 km/h; 16 mph) maximum
- Range: 8,000 nmi (15,000 km; 9,200 mi) at 13 kn (24 km/h; 15 mph)
- Complement: 6 officers, 74 enlisted men
- Armament: 2 x 20 mm guns; 3 in (76 mm)/50 gun

The USCGC Acacia (WAGL-406/WLB-406) is an Iris-class 180-foot seagoing buoy tender operated by the United States Coast Guard. Acacia was a multi-purpose vessel, nominally a buoy tender, but with equipment and capabilities for ice breaking, search and rescue, fire fighting, logistics, oil spill response, and other tasks as well. She spent almost all of her 62-year Coast Guard career on the Great Lakes. After decommissioning she became a museum ship in Manistee, Michigan.

== Construction and characteristics ==
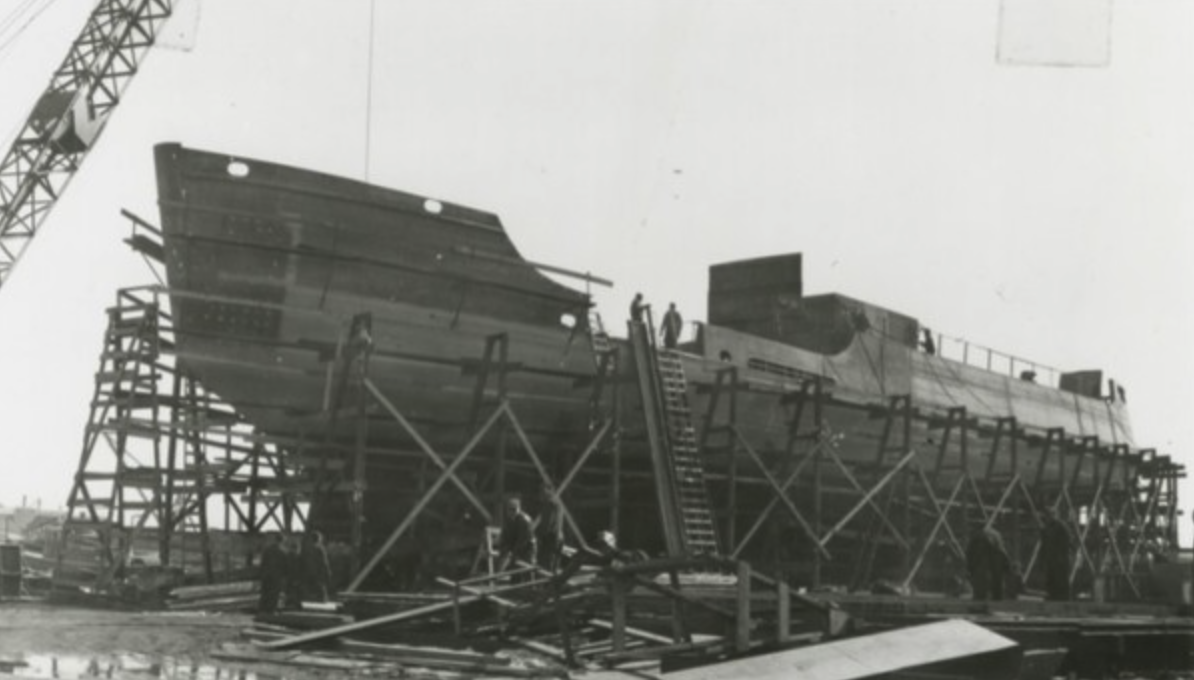
USCGC Acacia under construction in 1944

Acacia was built at the Zenith Dredge Company shipyard in Duluth, Minnesota. Her keel was laid down on 16 January 1944, she was launched on 7 April 1944, and she was commissioned on 1 September 1944. She was the second-to-last of the 39 similar 180-foot seagoing buoy tenders built. Her original coast was $927,156.

Her hull was constructed of welded steel plates framed with steel I-beams. As originally built, Acacia was 180 feet (55 m) long, with a beam of 37 feet (11 m), and a draft of 12 feet (3.7 m). Her displacement was 935 tons. While her overall dimensions remained the same over her career, the addition of new equipment raised her displacement to 1,025 tons by the end of her Coast Guard service.

She was designed to perform light ice-breaking. Her hull was reinforced with an "ice belt" of thicker steel around her waterline to protect it from punctures. Similarly, her bow was reinforced and shaped to ride over ice in order to crush it with the weight of the ship.

Acacia had a single 5-blade propeller 8.5 feet (2.6 m) in diameter. It was driven by a diesel-electric propulsion system. Two Cooper-Bessemer GND-8 4-cycle 8-cylinder Diesel engines produced 600 horsepower each. They provided power to two Westinghouse generators. The electricity from the generators ran an electric motor which turned the propeller.

She had a single cargo boom which had the ability to lift 20 tons onto her buoy deck.

The ship's fuel tanks had a capacity of approximately 28,875 US gallons (109,300 L). Acacia's unrefueled range was 8,000 nautical miles (15,000 km) at 13 knots, 12,000 nautical miles (22,000 km) at 12 knots, and 17,000 nautical miles (31,000 km) at 8.3 knots. Her potable water tanks had a capacity of 30,499 US gallons (115,450 L). Considering dry storage capacity and other factors, her at-sea endurance was 21 days.

Her wartime complement was 6 officers and 74 enlisted men. By 1964 this was reduced to 5 officers, 2 warrant officers, and 42 enlisted personnel.

Acacia was initially armed with a 3"/50 caliber gun mounted behind the pilot house. She also had two 20mm guns, one mounted on top of the wheelhouse and one on the aft deck. She carried these weapons in the Great Lakes under a wartime agreement with the Government of Canada. The Rush-Bagot Treaty had largely demilitarized the lakes, but the United States and Canada agreed to suspend some of its provisions during World War II. After the war ended, the treaty came back into full effect and all of Acacia's on-deck armament was removed, leaving only small arms for law enforcement actions. In 2006 Acacia and the other 10 Coast Guard cutters in the Great Lakes were armed with M 240B machine guns. This action was taken due to greater concerns regarding smuggling and terrorists entering the United States by boat. It was preceded by consultation with the Government of Canada under the terms of the Rush-Bagot Treaty.

At the time of construction, Acacia was designated WAGL, an auxiliary vessel, lighthouse tender. The designation was system was changed in 1965, and she was redesignated WLB, an oceangoing buoy tender.

The ship's original name was Thistle, but when it was learned that the US Army was operating USAHS Thistle the Coast Guard changed it to Acacia. She was named after the United States Lighthouse Service tender Acacia, the only tender sunk during World War II.

== Operating history ==
Acacia's first home port was Detroit, Michigan. Her primary mission was maintaining aids to navigation. Much of her activity was driven by the annual advance and retreat of heavy winter ice on the Great Lakes. Buoys were brought to port in the fall to prevent them from being damaged, sunk, or set adrift by ice. Acacia was reported to have picked up about 150 buoys from the Detroit River and nearby waters in ten days in December 1948. Buoys were cleaned, repaired, and repainted over the winter and redeployed by the ship in the spring.

Her second mission was icebreaking, a service she performed throughout her career. One aspect of her icebreaking work was to free ships that became trapped in the ice. In January 1945, for example, the freighter James Watt with a cargo of coal for the Ford River Rogue factory became ice-bound in Lake Erie. She struggled to free herself for two days without success. Acacia freed her within a half-hour of her arrival. In a similar case, she freed two tankers and a collier from Lake Erie ice in December 1951. A second icebreaking role was to escort ships through the ice, breaking a channel for the ship following her. This service was not without risk. On 1 April 1954 Acacia was leading the tanker L. S. Westcoat through the ice when she was rammed in the stern by her charge. The hulls of both vessels were damaged. A third icebreaking activity was to clear shipping lanes for future ship traffic. Acacia cleared ice in Lake Erie, the Straits of Mackinac, Lake St. Claire, and the Saint Claire River.

Acacia also participated in numerous search and rescue missions. In October 1951, the freighter George F. Rand collided with another ship in the Saint Claire River. Her hull was breached and she began to flood. Acacia was dispatched to provide assistance which included emergency pumps to control the flooding. On 1 June 1956 Acacia towed the disabled freighter George Hindman from the Saint Claire River where she was blocking ship traffic. The freighter Daniel J. Morrell broke up and sank in a storm on Lake Huron in November 1966. Acacia was dispatched to search for the crew and recovered the bodies of eight. A happier outcome was obtained after two freighters collided at the mouth of the Saint Claire River during the night of 26 August 1971. Acacia was able to rescue 16 people from Trans Michigan.

In the summer of 1958 Acacia's home port was changed to Port Huron, Michigan, where a new berth was built for her. The city spent $10,667 on the dock. The change in home port did not fundamentally change the ship's mission. She was responsible for 145 aids to navigation in the Port Huron area. She continued to break ice in the Saint Claire River, and during several winters participated in "Operation Coal Shovel" to break ice between Toledo, Ohio and Detroit for the coal ships supplying power plants and industries in Detroit.

In May 1975 Acacia sailed from Port Huron to the Coast Guard Yard in Curtis Bay, Maryland for major renovations. The majority of Acacia's crew transferred to the freshly renovated USCGC Bramble and sailed their new ship back to Port Huron. Acacia's main electrical motor was renovated, and new electrical switchboards and wiring were installed. Her main engines were overhauled. Crew spaces were modernized and enlarged by reducing the size of the forward hold. Water pipes were replaced and a new sewage system was installed. A bow thruster was added to improve the ship's maneuverability. The electric drive that ran the cargo boom was replaced with a hydraulic system. Over $9 million was appropriated for this renovation.

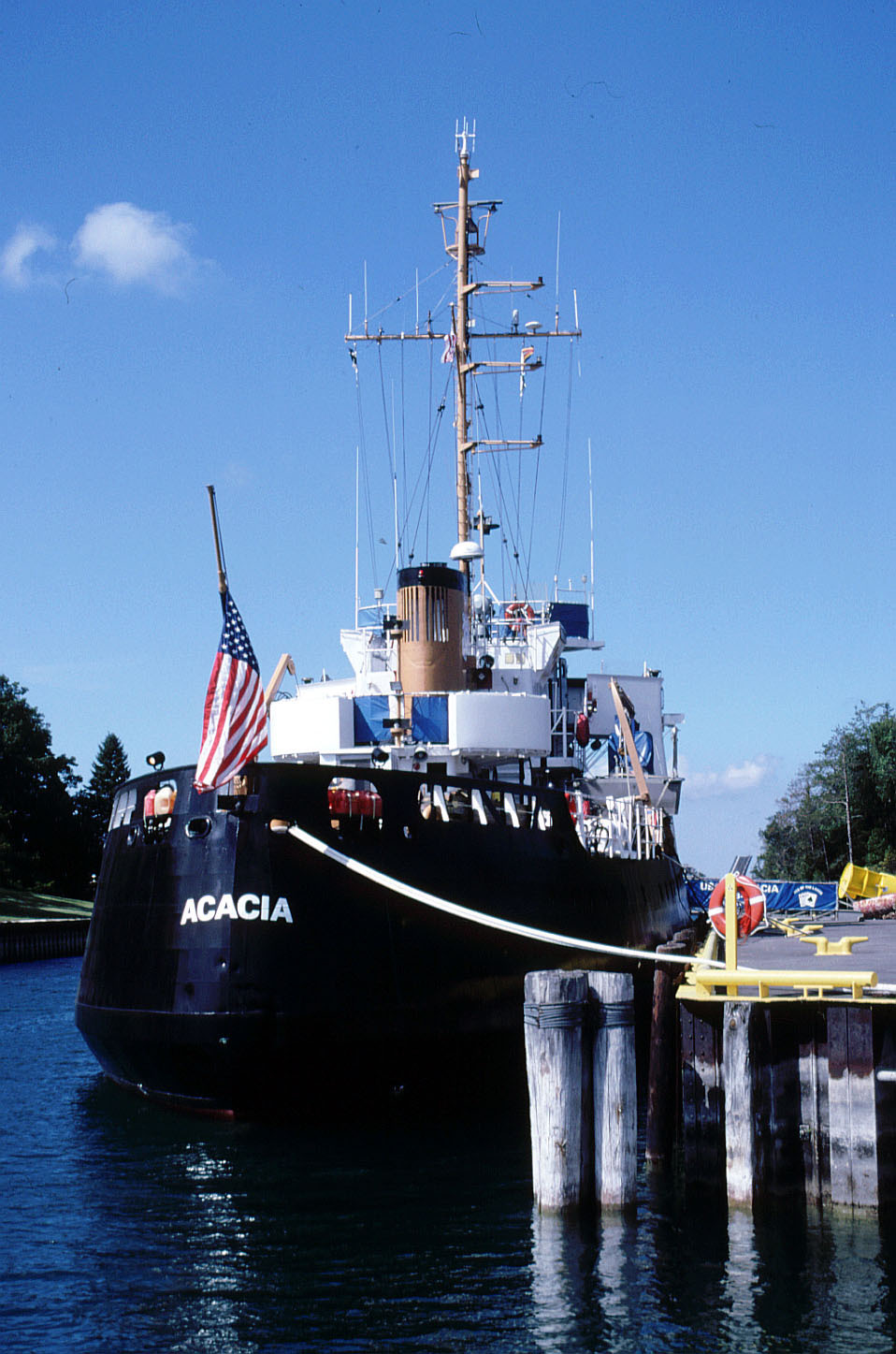
USCGC Acacia in Charlevoix in 2001

After her refit, Acacia was assigned to Sturgeon Bay, Wisconsin, where she replaced USCGC Mesquite, which was beginning her own renovation. Mesquite's crew was assigned to Acacia. Upon leaving the Coast Guard Yard, Acacia sailed to the Caribbean for training exercises. She arrived at her new homeport in September 1976. Her time at Sturgeon Bay was similar to her earlier service in Lakes Huron and Erie. Heavy seasonal ice drove much of her work on the buoy system and icebreaking was a frequent responsibility.

In the spring of 1979 Acacia was transferred to Grand Haven, Michigan. She was replaced in Sturgeon Bay by the newly launched USCGC Mobile Bay. Though moved across Lake Michigan, Acacia remained responsible for maintaining the same fleet of 220 buoys from Calumet Harbor to Little Bay De Noc. The smaller Mobile Bay did not have a crane capable of the work. She did get at least one new job while based at Grand Haven. In 1984, in cooperation with U.S. Fish and Wildlife Service hatcheries and the Michigan Department of Natural Resources, Acacia released 400,000 lake trout fingerlings on offshore reefs in Lake Michigan. It was hoped that fish released in the middle of the lake would have a higher survival rate than those released along the shore.

For four months during the winter of 1987–1988 Acacia was temporarily assigned to patrol Caribbean waters. During one of her patrols she intercepted 88 Haitians on a 45-foot (14 meter) wooden boat attempting to reach Florida. These refugees were repatriated to Haiti. She also assisted in the arrest of two Cuban drug smugglers. She arrived back in Grand Haven in April 1988, in time to replace buoys after the spring ice break-up.

In December 1989, Acacia responded to the grounding of USCGC Mesquite off of the Keweenaw Peninsula in Lake Superior. Acacia was able to assist in stabilizing the wreck and containing the diesel oil spill. She was awarded the Coast Guard Meritorious Unit Commendation for her work, but winter storms destroyed the abandoned Mesquite. The Coast Guard reassigned Acacia to Charlevoix, Michigan to replace Mesquite. There was no replacement cutter assigned to Grand Haven, reducing the number of buoy tenders in the Great Lakes from five to four. The Coast Guard justified the move based on cost savings, but others attributed it to the influence of U.S. Representative Bob Davis, who represented Charlevoix in Congress. He was vice-chairman of the House Merchant Marine and Fisheries Committee at the time. The move left ill-feeling towards the Coast Guard in Grand Haven. Acacia arrived at her new homeport on 15 June 1990.

After rioting broke out in Cuba in August 1994, Fidel Castro announced that anyone who wanted to leave the country could. Thousands did so, creating a crisis of unsafe small boats and rafts intent on reaching the United States. On 26 August 1994 Acacia was ordered to the Caribbean to respond. By the time she reached the area, Operation Uphold Democracy, the United States intervention to restore Jean-Bertrand Aristide to the presidency of Haiti, was underway. Acacia was retasked to survey and buoy the major ports that were used to support the operation including Port-au-Prince, Cap-Hatien, and Miragoane. The ship earned the Armed Forces Expeditionary Medal for her work in Haiti. She returned to Charlevoix on 17 November 1994.

Acacia was decommissioned on 7 June 2006, after 62 years of service. She was the last of the 180-foot buoy tenders to be retired.

== Museum ==
Immediately after decommissioning, Acacia was donated to the State of Illinois for the benefit of the American Academy of Industry. This nonprofit group planned to turn her into a maritime museum in Chicago. The vessel, which was delivered in full working order with only her machine guns removed, was temporarily moored at Burns Harbor in Indiana. The plan for a Chicago-based museum was never executed because suitable moorage could not be found. Through the efforts of a common board member, the ship was transferred from the American Academy of Industry to The Society for the Preservation of the S.S. City of Milwaukee. On 16 October 2009, Acacia steamed under her own power to Manistee, Michigan, where she became part of the SS City of Milwaukee National Historic Landmark museum. The ship was dedicated in her new museum role on 13 August 2011. Acacia is open to the public as part of the museum.
