= Keweenaw Underwater Preserve =

Preservation area in the U.S. state of Michigan

- Location within Michigan
- Location: Lake Superior, Keweenaw County, Houghton County, Michigan, USA
- Nearest city: Houghton, Michigan
- Coordinates: 47.385°N 88.372°W
- Area: 103 square miles (270 km^{2})
- Governing body: Michigan Department of Natural Resources

The Keweenaw Underwater Preserve is a preservation area in the U.S. state of Michigan. Located in Lake Superior, it protects waters that lie offshore Keweenaw Peninsula.

== Keweenaw Point ==
The Michigan Department of Environmental Quality, which oversees the Keweenaw Underwater Preserve, calls the point of Keweenaw Peninsula a "catcher's mitt" for storm-beset Lake freighters and other boats in the southern half of Lake Superior. Numerous wrecks, overseen as part of this preserve, can be seen here and are the object of recreational dives.

== Shipwrecks ==
Eagle River, Eagle Harbor, and Copper Harbor are all home to shipwrecks dating back to the 1800s. They are preserved in shallow water and been broken up by ice and storms.

One of the most recent large boats on the Great Lakes to be a total loss, the former United States Coast Guard cutter Mesquite, grounded off Keweenaw in 1989 and is now a diveable wreck in this preserve.

The largest wreck in the preserve is the freighter William C. Moreland which ran aground in 1910 and is a diveable, protected wreck resting in 40-feet of water.

Brendon Baillod is a maritime historian who has compiled information on and located many of the shipwrecks near Keweenaw.

=== Known wrecks and dive sites ===
Ship	Ship type	Build date	Sunk date	Fate	Coordinates	Image
John Jacob Astor	Two masted wooden brig	1835	1844	Ran aground in winter, broke up in severe winter conditions.	N 47° 28.340 W 087° 51.880	
Charles H. Bradley	Wooden steamer	1890	1931	Grounded, fire broke out, and sunk.	N 47° 02.140 W 088° 29.020	
City of Bangor	Freighter	1896	1926	Trapped in ice and declared a total loss.	N 47° 27.370 W 087° 44.760	City of Bangor ship
City of St. Joseph	Steel barge	1890	1942	Struck a reef during a violent Gale, along with companion barge "Transport".	N 47° 28.200 W 088° 06.750	
City of Superior	Wooden propeller	1857	1857	Slammed into shore during intermittent snow squalls, broken by gales and storms.	N 47° 28.300 W 087° 51.400	
Colorado	Cargo ship	1887	1898	Struck and stranded on the wreck of propeller James Pickands.	N 47° 25.710 W 088° 17.930	
Fern	Tug	1883	1901	Hit by a sudden storm while working on the wreck of Colorado.	N 47° 25.460 W 088° 18.020	
Gazelle	Passenger/cargo ship	1858	1860	Breached upon rocks and broke up.	N 47° 27.430 W 088° 19.270	
John L. Gross	Wooden schooner	1857	1873	Struck a rock, beached and battered by heavy seas.	N 47° 27.590 W 088° 09.310	
International			1913		N 46° 58.970 W 088° 25.840	
Langham	Bulk cargo carrier	1888	1910	Loaded with coal, burned to the waterline, and sunk.	N 47° 22.370 W 087° 55.530	
Lizzie A. Law	Wooden schooner barge	1875	1908	Grounded during a gale and broke apart.	N 47° 05.344 W 088° 18.931	
Mediator	Wooden schooner barge	1862	1898	Thrown ashore by gale and sunk.	N 47° 07.310 W 088° 33.010	
Mesquite	USCG Seagoing buoy tender	1942	1989	Ran aground in winter. Sunk by the Coast Guard as a dive site.	N 47° 23.440 W 087° 44.530	USCGC Mesquite
William C. Moreland	Lake freighter	1910	1910	Grounded on Sawtooth Reef, broke into sections, and sunk.	N 47° 25.070 W 088° 19.600	William C Moreland
Panama	Wooden bulk freight steamer	1888	1906	Hit storm, run aground, and broke in two.	N 46° 17.270 W 089° 32.890	
Peninsula	Steam-powered cargo ship	1849	1854	Snapped propeller shaft backing out from dock and abandoned.	N 47° 25.100 W 088° 17.740	
James Pickands	Wooden bulk freighter	1886	1894	Hit Sawtooth Reef, gale broke ship in two.	N 47° 25.710 W 088° 17.930	
Sailor Boy	Wooden passenger steamer	1891	1923	Caught fire, sunk.	N 47° 07.386 W 088° 32.945	
Scotia	Iron steamer	1873	1884	Ran aground, waves broke the ship, sunk.	N 47° 25.870 W 087° 42.290	
Tioga	Iron package freighter	1885	1919	Ran aground on Sawtooth Reef during a winter storm, then went to pieces in a gale.	N 47° 26 260 W 088° 16.220	
Transport	Iron barge	1880	1942	Struck a reef during a violent Gale, along with companion barge "City of St. Joseph".	N 47° 28.201 W 088° 06.750	
Traveller	Wooden sidewheel steamer	1852	1865	Burned and sunk.	N 47° 27.570 W 088° 09.120	
Uarda			1912		N 47° 07.420 W 088° 35.310	
Wasaga	Wood steamer	1876	1910	Burned to a total loss.	N 47° 28.170 W 087° 53.150	
