= City of Bangor (ship) =

Great Lakes freighter that sank in Lake Superior

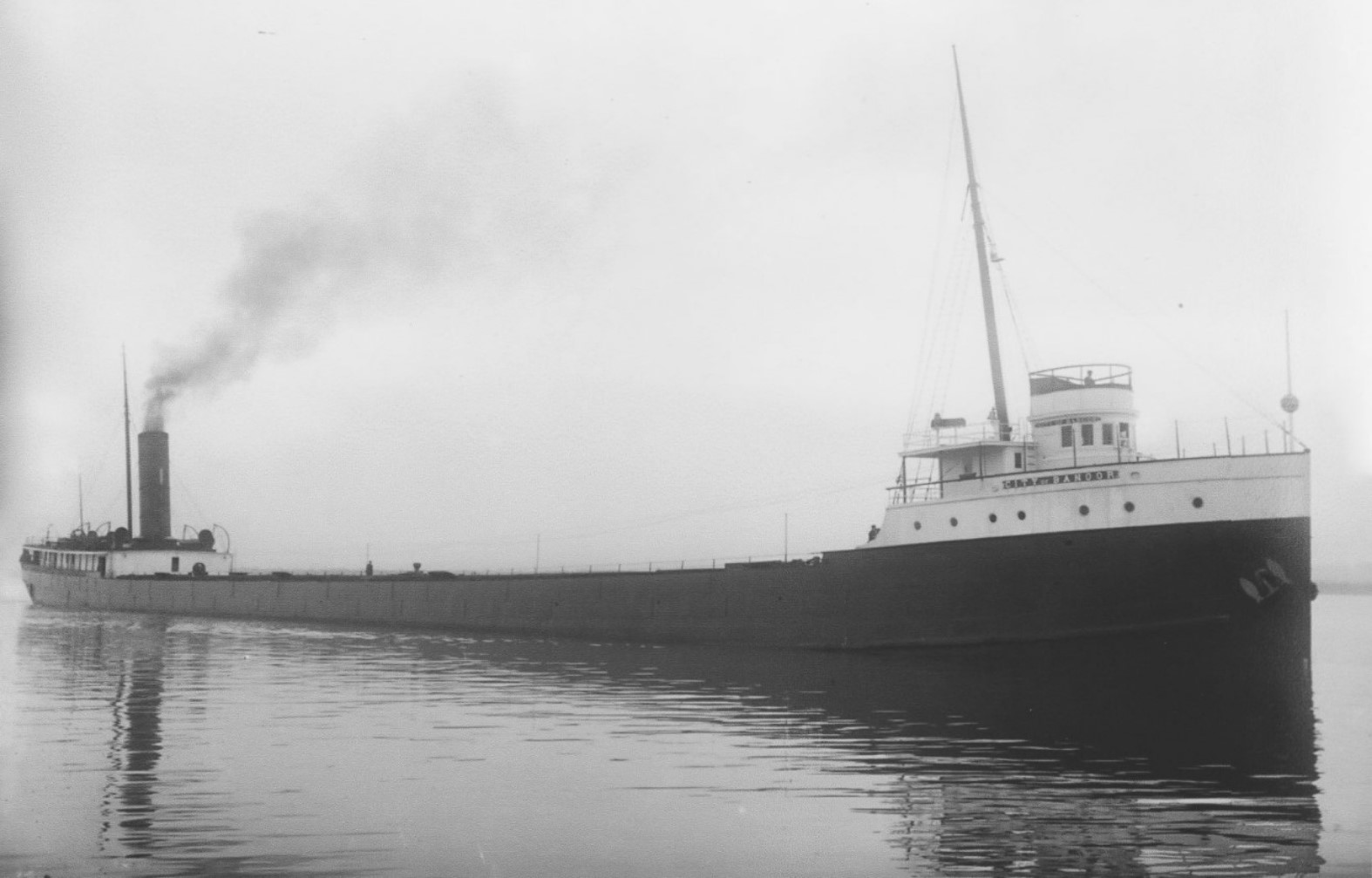

History

United States
- Name: City of Bangor
- Operator: Eddy-Shaw Transportation Co; Bay City, Michigan 1896-1906; Lake Transit Co; Bay City, Michigan 1906-1925; Nicholson Transit Co; Detroit, Michigan 1925-1926
- Builder: Wheeler, F.W. & Co; West Bay City, Michigan
- Yard number: 00113
- Completed: 1896
- Fate: Stranded November 30, 1926 Keweenaw Peninsula, Lake Superior. Declared total loss; Hull scrapped on site 1942
- Notes: United States Registry #127131

General characteristics
- Class & type: freighter
- Tonnage: 3690 gross 2976 net (1896); 4202 gross 3058 net (1904); 3994 gross 2847 net (1925)
- Length: 372.42 ft (113.51 m) (1896); 445.42 ft (135.76 m)(1904)
- Beam: 44.66 ft (13.61 m)
- Height: 23.42 ft (7.14 m)
- Propulsion: Triple expansion steam
- Crew: 30
- Notes: Ship rebuilt and lengthened in 1904.

City of Bangor was a freighter that had a 30-year career on the Great Lakes. Originally designed to carry ore, the ship was converted into an automobile carrier in 1925. She was trapped in ice on Lake Superior November 30, 1926, and after multiple salvage attempts, Bangor was declared a total loss.

== Early service ==
City of Bangor was built in 1896 at Bay City, Michigan. In 1926, the ship was converted to carry automobiles. At the time of the wreck, it was owned by the Nicholson Transit Company.

== Shipwreck ==
City of Bangor was captained by William J. Mackin. On the night of November 30, 1926, Bangor was carrying 248 new Chrysler automobiles from Detroit, Michigan to Duluth, Minnesota, when a severe storm drove her onto the rocks of the Keweenaw Peninsula, on Michigan's Upper Peninsula. Eighteen cars that were spiked to the deck of the ship slipped overboard and were lost. During the same storm, Thomas Maytham, which was carrying 20,000 tons of grain from Duluth to Toledo, Ohio, went aground on the other side of the peninsula.

== Rescue ==
The next morning, after the winds had subsided, Bangor's crew of 29 managed to free the lifeboats, and by afternoon all the men had made it ashore. They began to walk to the nearest village, Copper Harbor, which was about 15 miles away, but became lost in the unfamiliar territory. They spent the night with a fire but no shelter, inadequate clothing, and no food.

The next day, a United States Coast Guard rescue lifeboat, out of Eagle Harbor Life Saving Station, came around the point while carrying Thomas Maytham's crew, and discovered Bangor's crew. The Coast Guard captain dropped off the men from Thomas Maytham at Copper Harbor and returned for the men from City of Bangor. The men were exhausted and suffering from hypothermia; several were hospitalized with frostbite.

The majority of the Chryslers were in the hold, separated from the flooded engine room by a strong partition. A visual inspection of the hold showed that the cars were in good condition. When the water around the wrecked ship had frozen solid, an ice ramp was constructed, and the cars were driven off the ship. The area around the Keweenaw Peninsula was heavily forested and buried in about 4 ft (1.2 m) of snow, so the cars were driven along the icy banks of the lake to Copper Harbor. When the roads opened in the spring, the cars were driven to Calumet, Michigan, loaded onto trains, and taken to Detroit for repair and re-sale. 202 of the vehicles were salvaged from the wreck and sold. The Chryslers were 1927 model 50s, and were advertised for $750 for the coupe and $830 for the sedan at the time.

City of Bangor herself was a total loss. In 1929 she was cut down to the waterline, and in 1944, underwater wreckage was cut up for scrap metal for use during World War II.

== Legacy ==
The City of Bangor wreck site is now part of the Keweenaw Underwater Preserve, established in 1991, along with the nearby wrecks of Altadoc and Scotia, and she can be visited by scuba divers. However, the wrecksite includes only limited remains.

The only remaining part of the Eagle Harbor Life Saving Station, the boathouse, is now a museum containing shipwreck memorabilia including one of the 1927 Chryslers from City of Bangor.

The book Shipwrecked and Rescued: Cars and Crew by Larry Jorgenson tells the story of the ship.

== Sources ==
- Billock, Jennifer (12 May 2014). Keweenaw County. Arcadia Publishing Incorporated. ISBN 978-1-4396-4513-0.
