= Trevor Dawson =

English businessman (1866-1931)

Commander Sir Trevor Dawson Bt

Managing Director of Vickers
- In office 1906–1931

Personal details
- Born: Arthur Trevor Dawson; 1 May 1866 Dalkeith House, Richmond upon Thames, Surrey, England
- Died: 19 May 1931 (aged 65) Edgewarebury House, Elstree, Hertfordshire, England

Commander Sir Arthur Trevor Dawson, 1st Baronet (1 May 1866 – 19 May 1931) was an English businessman who served as managing director of the armaments giant Vickers from 1906 to 1931.

== Early life and naval career ==
Dawson was born in Dalkeith House, Richmond upon Thames, Surrey, the son of landowner and barrister Hugh Dawson and his wife Mary Ann (née Chaffer).

He joined the Royal Navy as a cadet in 1879 and trained at the Royal Academy, Gosport, and in the training ship HMS Britannia in Dartmouth, Devon. In 1881, he was promoted midshipman in the Channel Squadron and undertook further training at the Royal Naval College, Portsmouth, the Royal Naval College, Greenwich, the Royal Artillery College at Woolwich, and the torpedo school in HMS Vernon. He was promoted lieutenant on 20 November 1887 and served in a cruiser in the Mediterranean Fleet. In 1892, he became an experimental officer at Woolwich Arsenal.

== Business career ==
In 1896, he left the Royal Navy to join the armaments firm Vickers as ordnance superintendent, becoming a director in 1898, and managing director in 1906. He remained in this post until his death. He was also chairman of Chilworth Gunpowder from 1900 and was a director of many of Vickers' subsidiaries, including Canadian Vickers, Vickers-Terni in Italy, and the Placencias Arsenal in Spain. Other directorships included Wolseley Motors and William Beardmore & Co. He participated in the development of the Vickers machine gun, co-inventing the muzzle booster together with J. Ramsay in 1904. Another invention by Dawson in 1927 concerned a vehicle drive system, and in particular the patent GB265898, which described an invention for a combined wheel-cum-track-drive system.

He retained close connections with the Royal Navy (his commission on the Emergency List was restored in 1902) and the British Government and sat on a number of government committees. He also collected intelligence for the Admiralty on his foreign trips, including one occasion when he skated around the ice-bound dockyards of Kiel to see the German naval ships under construction. He was knighted on 13 December 1909.

During the First World War, his prominence in the armaments industry naturally increased even further. Although he retained the trust of the government, Vickers, along with other armaments firms, was accused of charging too much. His standing was also damaged by the so-called 'dope scandal'. In 1915–1916, Dawson aided the MP and speculator Grant Morden in setting up the British Cellulose and Chemical Manufacturing Company. The value of the shares was later pushed up by unscrupulous means to an artificially high level, until they were worth £14 10s in 1918 (having originally been worth 6d each). This blatant war profiteering was investigated by a parliamentary select committee in 1918 and an official inquiry chaired by Lord Sumner in 1919.

He was to have been raised to the peerage in the 1917 New Year Honours, but his name was removed from the list at the last minute, probably because of the unpopularity of the armaments companies. He was, however, created a baronet, of Edgewarebury, of the parish of Edgware, in the County of Middlesex, in the 1920 New Year Honours. He was also appointed Grand Cross of the Order of Naval Merit by Spain and was a member of the Order of the Rising Sun and the Order of the Sacred Treasure, 2nd class, of Japan. He was a member of council of the Imperial Society of Knights Bachelor. In recognition of his war service, he was promoted commander in the Royal Navy as of 11 November 1918. The Canadian Steamship Lines named a 600-foot lake freighter the Sir Trevor Dawson in October 1916.

After the war, his influence declined. Another scandal broke in 1920, when Vickers was sued by Admiral Sir Percy Scott over royalty payments for a gun sight manufactured by Vickers which Scott had invented and patented. The judge, Lord Coleridge, made it quite clear that he did not believe Dawson's testimony, and found in Scott's favour. Dawson offered to resign from Vickers, but was refused. He was later implicated in shady dealings with the Turkish government over oil in Iraq.

Dawson was a strong proponent of airships, which Vickers had begun building in 1908. He persuaded Vickers to collaborate in the construction of the R100 in the second half of the 1920s. Although the airship was a success, Vickers lost a substantial amount of money (£220,000) over the project.

== Interests and family ==
Dawson was a committed imperialist. He was a knight of the Round Table Club, which promoted inter-imperial trade. In 1916, he formed a pressure group called the London Imperialists, which aimed to promote the election of MPs sympathetic to imperial trade in London constituencies. This later expanded into the British Commonwealth Union, and he sat on the executive committee from 1918 to 1925.

Dawson married Louise Grant in 1892. They had two sons and two daughters. He died suddenly of heart failure at his country seat, Edgewarebury House in Elstree, Hertfordshire, and was buried in Elstree churchyard. The baronetcy passed to his son, Sir Hugh Trevor Dawson, who also served as an officer in the Royal Navy.

== Footnotes ==
Business positions
Preceded by Albert Vickers	Managing Director of Vickers Ltd; 1906–1931	Succeeded by Charles Craven
Court offices
Preceded by Sir William Bull, 1st Baronet	Knight Principal of the Imperial Society of Knights Bachelor; 1931	Succeeded by Sir Gerald Wollaston
Baronetage of the United Kingdom
New creation	Baronet (of Rumbelows); 1920–1931	Succeeded by Hugh Dawson
