= SS Willis L. King =

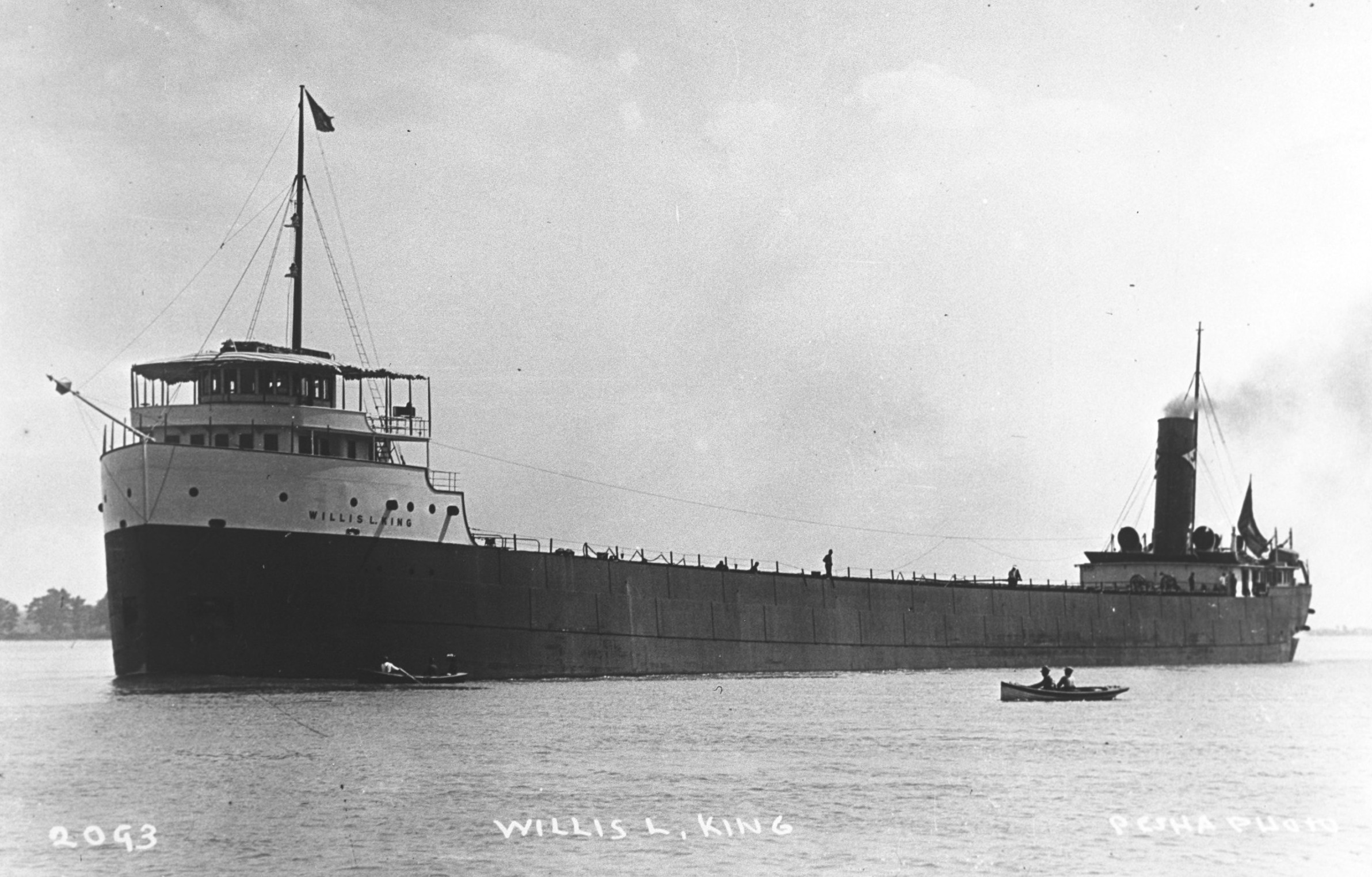
- Willis L. King underway

History

United States
- Name: Willis L. King 1911–1952; C.L. Austin 1952–1984
- Operator: Interstate Steamship Company 1911–1949; Jones and Laughlin Steel Company 1949–1952; Wilson Transit Company 1952–1973; Kinsman Marine Transit Company 1973–1985; S.&E. Shipping Corporation 1975–1984
- Port of registry: United States, Duluth, Minnesota
- Builder: Great Lakes Engineering Works, Ecorse, Michigan
- Yard number: 79
- Laid down: September 12, 1910
- Launched: December 17, 1910
- In service: March 20, 1911
- Out of service: 1984
- Identification: U.S. Registry #208397; IMO number: 5056389
- Fate: Scrapped in 1984 in Ashtabula, Ohio by the Triad Salvage Inc.

General characteristics
- Class & type: Lake freighter
- Tonnage: 7,568 GRT; 5,712 NRT
- Length: 600 ft (180 m) LOA 580 ft (180 m) LBP
- Beam: 58 ft (18 m)
- Height: 33 ft (10 m)
- Installed power: 2 x Scotch marine boilers
- Propulsion: 1,800 hp (1,300 kW) triple expansion steam engine

SS Willis L. King (Official number 208397) was a 600-foot-long (180 m), steel-hulled, propeller-driven American Great Lakes freighter built in 1911 by the Great Lakes Engineering Works of Ecorse, Michigan. She was scrapped in 1984 in Ashtabula, Ohio. Willis L. King is best known for her collision with the steamer Superior City on August 20, 1920, in Whitefish Bay.

== History ==
In 1906 the Jones and Laughlin Steel Company commissioned two 552-foot-long (168 m) freighters named B.F. Jones and James Laughlin, both named after the founders of the large company, and both were built by the Great Lakes Engineering Works of Ecorse, Michigan. The large fleet was managed by W.H. Becker, a prominent fleet manager and owner from Cleveland, Ohio.

Due to the increasing demand for iron ore, J & L commissioned two identical vessels; Willis L. King from the Great Lakes Engineering Works (GLEW) of Ecorse, Michigan, and the William C Moreland from the American Ship Building Company (AMSHIP) of Lorain, Ohio. They were identical in every respect and had a length of 600 feet (180 m) and a 12,000-ton cargo capacity.

Willis L. King's keel was laid on September 12, 1910; slightly over three months later she was launched on December 17, 1911 as hull number #79. She was commissioned by the Interstate Steamship Company (W.H. Becker, Mgr.) of Cleveland, Ohio (a subsidiary of Jones and Laughlin Steel Company). She entered service on April 18, 1911, sailing light from Ecorse, Michigan, bound for Toledo, Ohio.

== Superior City disaster ==
On August 20, 1920 Willis L. King had just unloaded a cargo of iron ore at Ashtabula, Ohio, and was on her way to the ore docks to pick up another load of ore. Meanwhile, Superior City was downbound from Two Harbors, Minnesota, heavily loaded with 7,600 tons of iron ore in her cargo hold.

Noted Great Lakes maritime historian and author Dwight Boyer described the collision between the two ships in his book Ships and Men of the Great Lakes. He wrote:

"She was [R]ammed on her port side, aft of midships … [causing] … a tremendous explosion when the terrible inrushing wall of cold water burst her aft bulkheads and hit the boilers. The vessel’s stern was literally blown off…. [and she] was nearly halved in the collision."

Most of Superior City's crew were trying to lower the lifeboats that were located directly above the boilers. When the cold water caused the boilers to explode, the majority of the crew was killed instantly. The deadly collision occurred at 9:10 pm.

== Later history ==
On May 31, 1926, Willis L. King collided with the 600-foot-long (180 m) laker Pontiac in heavy fog just twelve miles above the Soo Locks.
