= BOPE =

BOPE or Bope may refer to:

== Military police units ==
- Batalhão de Operações Policiais Especiais, the police tactical unit of the Military Police of Rio de Janeiro State, Brazil
- Battalion of Special Operations (Portuguese: Batalhão de Operações Especiais), a unit of the military police of Paraná, Brazil
- Special Operations Battalion (PMAC) (Portuguese: Batalhão de Operações Especiais), a special operations force of the military police of the State of Acre, Brazil

== Other uses ==
- Bope Bokadi (born 1996), Congolese professional footballer
- SS H.P. Bope
