= Thomas F. Cole (businessman) =

Mining executive

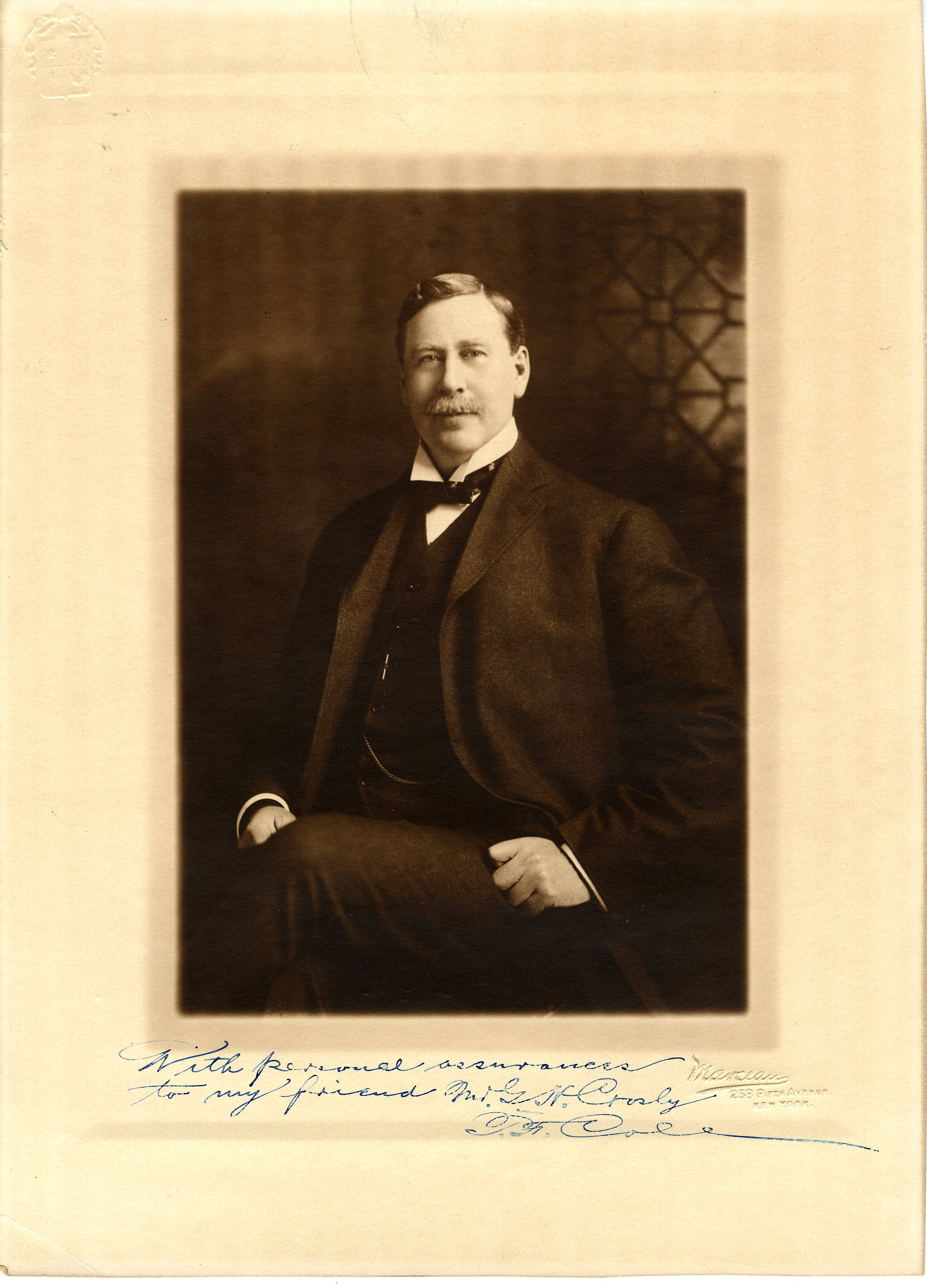
- Born: July 19, 1862; Keweenaw County, MI
- Died: June 4, 1939 (aged 76); Pasadena, CA
- Occupations: President- Oliver Mining Company, North Butte Mining Company, Greene-Cananea Copper Company, Chandler Iron Company, Minnesota Iron Company Director- The Ojibwe Mining Company, Butte Coalition Copper Company, Rainbow Lode Development Company Other or Unknown involvement- Hedley Gold Mining Company, Consolidated Amador Mining Company, Calumet and Arizona Mining Company, International Smelting and Refining Company.
- Spouse: Elcey Hoatson

Thomas Frederick Cole (19 July 1862–4 June 1939) was a mining executive active in Michigan, Minnesota, and Arizona. He was President of the Oliver Iron Mining Company from 1901 to 1909. His namesake boat the SS Thomas F. Cole was built by United States Steel's Pittsburgh Steamship Company in 1907.

== Early life ==
Cole was born in Keweenaw County, Michigan to Cornish parents on July 19, 1862. At the age of six, his miner father died in a mine explosion. Two years later he got his first job sorting copper rocks at 50 cents per day. His first management job at 27 where he oversaw several Michigan mines earning him the title "Boy Superintendent."

== Iron ==
Working his way up in the iron mining industry, Cole came to the Oliver Iron Mining Company as a general superintendent. In 1901 the Oliver was sold to J. P. Morgan and became a subsidiary of U.S. Steel. Under new ownership, Cole was promoted to Vice-President and then President within a year. At that point, he had about 20,000 men working under him. Under his direction, he moved the company's headquarters from Pittsburgh to his resident city of Duluth, Minnesota. The western Mesabi range was developed by Cole's ability to convince the directors of the company to open mines of lower grade ore. The $10,000,000 investment was the largest Oliver would see in those years. The USS's new model city of Coleraine was named after him. He left his post in 1909 to focus on his copper investments in Montana and Arizona.

== Copper ==
Cole and his investors created the Calumet and Arizona Mining Company in 1901. Their first mine, the Irish Mag in Bisbee, Arizona, was the richest strike in the region at the time. C&A also built a 500-ton smelter for copper development in the Bisbee area. In 1906 he was named president of the Butte Coalition Mining Company. Later that year he and two others from Duluth formed the Greene-Cananea Copper Company with capital stock valued at $60,000,000.

== Death ==
Cole continued to live in Duluth until he left for New York in 1916. Retiring in 1926 he moved to California. In 1939 he committed suicide by shooting himself in his garden at his Pasadena estate. He died at the age of 76.
