= SS H. P. Bope =

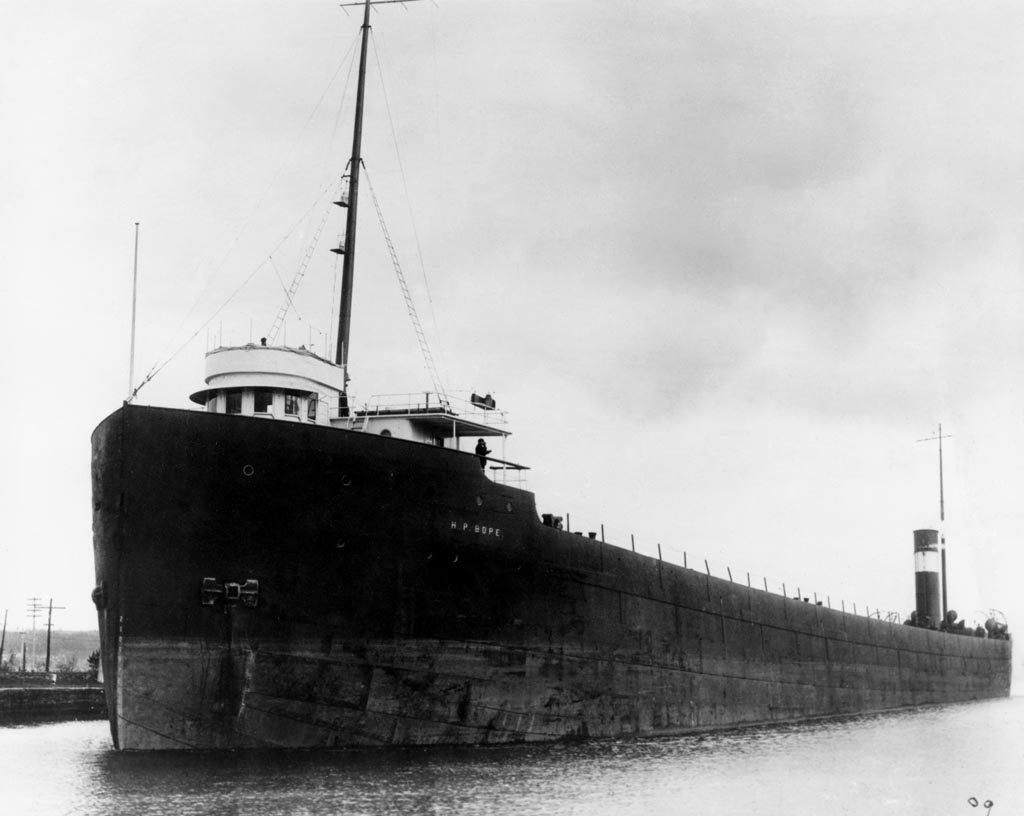
- The H.P. Bope sailing through the Soo Locks in 1909

History

United States
- Name: H.P. Bope (1907–1916); E.A.S. Clarke (1916–1970); Kinsman Voyager (1970–1978)
- Operator: Standard Steamship Company (1907–1913); Lackawanna Steamship Company (later Interlake Steamship Company) (1913–1970); Kinsman Marine Transit Company (1970–1978)
- Port of registry: United States, Duluth, Minnesota
- Builder: Superior Shipbuilding Company, Superior, Wisconsin
- Yard number: 519
- Launched: October 19, 1907
- In service: October 1907
- Out of service: June 26, 1978
- Identification: U.S. Registry #204664; IMO number: 5095464
- Fate: Scrapped in 1978, in Santander, Spain

General characteristics
- Class & type: Lake freighter
- Tonnage: 5,750 GRT; 4,422 NRT
- Length: 560 ft (170 m)
- Beam: 56 ft (17 m)
- Height: 30 ft (9.1 m)
- Installed power: 2x Scotch marine boilers; 2,200 hp (1,600 kW)
- Propulsion: Quadruple expansion steam engine

The H.P. Bope was an American steel-hulled, propeller-driven Great Lakes freighter built in 1907 by the Superior Shipbuilding Company of Superior, Wisconsin for service on the Great Lakes of North America. She was used to transport bulk cargoes such as coal, iron ore and grain.

== History ==
The H.P. Bope was launched on October 19, 1907, as hull yard number 519. She had a length of 560 feet (170 m), a beam of 56 feet (17 m) and a depth of 30 feet (9.1 m). She was powered by a 2,200-horsepower (1,600 kW) quadruple expansion steam engine and fueled by two coal-fired Scotch marine boilers.

In 1913 the H.P. Bope was transferred to the Lackawanna Steamship Company of Cleveland, Ohio. Later that year the fleet was renamed Interlake Steamship Company. In 1916 the H.P. Bope was renamed E.A.S. Clarke. The E.A.S. Clarke anchored off the Great Lakes Engineering Works in the Detroit River on October 26, 1924, because of heavy fog. As she was swinging at anchor the steamer B.F. Jones struck the E.A.S. Clarke near her aft deckhouse causing her to sink almost immediately. There were no deaths in this incident.

In 1952 the E.A.S. Clarke had a new top tank and two new side tanks installed. She also had her cargo hatches rebuilt from 32 cargo hatches on 12-foot (3.7 m) centers to 16 hatches on 24-foot (7.3 m) centers. In 1953 she had new Foster-Wheeler water tube boilers installed. She went into layup in the winter of 1960. She remained in layup when she was transferred to the Pickands Mather Company.

=== Kinsman Voyager ===
In April 1970 the E.A.S. Clarke was sold to the Kinsman Marine Transit Company of Cleveland, Ohio and renamed Kinsman Voyager. On September 30, 1972, the Kinsman Voyager was departing the Globe elevator in Superior, Wisconsin when she backed into a mud bank and severely damaged her rudder. She was laid up on May 26, 1973, in Toledo, Ohio.

In the Spring of 1974 the Kinsman Voyager was sold to the Marine Salvage Ltd. of Port Colborne, Ontario. She arrived in Port Colborne on April 22, 1974, towed by the tug Salvage Monarch. She was eventually sold to Lutgens & Reimers of Hamburg, Germany. On May 2, 1975, the Kinsman Voyager passed Cape Vincent towed by the tugs Salvage Monarch and the Helen M. McAllister bound for Quebec City. The Kinsman Voyager and the steamer James E. Ferris departed Quebec on June 7, 1975, towed by the Polish tug Jantar. They arrived at Hamburg on July 4, 1975. The hulls of the Kinsman Voyager and the James E. Ferris were used as storage hulks. The Kinsman Voyager arrived in Bilbao, Spain on June 26, 1978. She was later towed to Pasaia, Spain on July 16, 1978. On August 29, 1978, she was towed to Santander, Spain where she was scrapped by Recuperaciones Submarinas S.A.
