= Mississagi (ship) =

Ship built in 1943

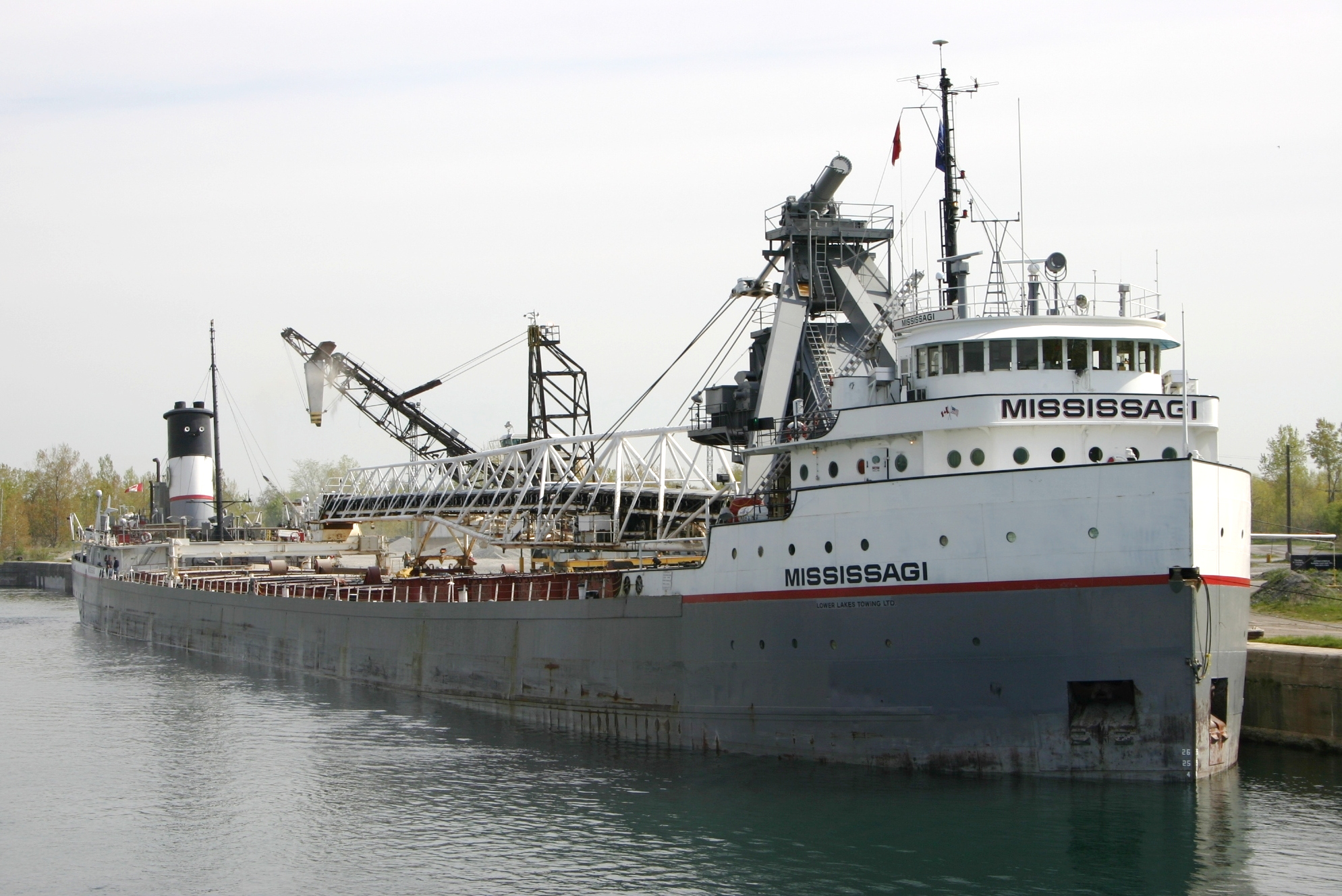
- The Mississagi on the St Lawrence Seaway (2005)

History
- Name: Mississagi
- Owner: Lower Lakes Towing
- Port of registry: Port Dover, Ontario Canada
- Builder: Great Lakes Engineering Works
- Yard number: 292
- Laid down: 28 May 1942
- Launched: 23 December 1942
- Completed: July 1943
- Acquired: 22 July 1943
- Out of service: 8 January 2021
- Identification: IMO number: 5128467; MMSI number: 316004940
- Fate: Undergoing scrapping
- Notes: Former names: Hill Annex (July 1943), George A. Sloan (July 1943 - April 2001)

General characteristics
- Type: Type L6-S-B1 lake freighter
- Tonnage: 10,588 GT; 15,865 DWT
- Length: 189.13 m (620 ft 6 in)
- Beam: 18.29 m (60 ft 0 in)
- Depth: 10.67 m (35 ft 0 in)
- Propulsion: Caterpillar 3612TA 12 cyl. diesel (1985)

Mississagi was a Type L6-S-B1 lake freighter launched in 1943. Originally she was powered by a 2,500 horsepower (1,900 kW) triple-expansion steam engine. In 1985 her steam engines were replaced by a 4,500 horsepower (3,400 kW) diesel engine. She was built to a design from the United States Maritime Commission by the Great Lakes Engineering Works in River Rouge, Michigan. She had fifteen sister ships, also built to the Maritime Commission's design, known colloquially as "Maritimers".

The vessel was originally commissioned as Hill Annex. When she was acquired by the Pittsburgh Steamship Company in July 1943 she was rechristened George A. Sloan. She was bought by the Bradley Transportation Company in 1966, which converted her to a self-unloading bulk carrier. In 1967 Bradley Transportation was purchased by US Steel, which also owned Pittsburgh Steamship, which returned the George A. Sloan to Pittsburgh fleet.

The George A. Sloan was sold in 2001 to Lower Lakes Towing Ltd., Ontario, Canada, and renamed Mississagi. Her final voyage was from Thunder Bay to Hamilton with a cargo of wheat, she arrived at Hamilton 8 January 2021. After being discharged she was officially retired. In April 2021 Mississagi sailed to Sarnia, Ontario, for indefinite layup. Here she was stripped for parts and equipment.

On October 10, 2021, the Mississagi arrived, under tow, at Purvis Marine Scrapyard in Sault Ste. Marie, Ontario, Canada for scrapping. As of early 2025, the vessel's scrapping is yet to be completed.

== Emergencies ==
In 1966, the Mississagi ran aground in the Straits of Mackinac. She was laid-up in 2000, and sold to Port Dover, Ontario, firm Lower Lakes Towing Limited, which renamed her Mississagi for the start of the 2001 season. On October 4, 2004, she nearly collided with the seawall at Port Huron, Michigan

On February 26, 2015, a fire occurred aboard the Mississagi. At the time, the ship was docked in the Port of Hamilton. Firefighters and Confined Space Rescuers from the Hamilton Fire Department responded to the incident. The fire was caused by welding; only minor injuries resulted.

On April 22, 2015, while downbound on the lower St. Marys River, the Mississagi ran aground near De Tour Village, Michigan. At the time of the accident, the vessel was loaded with rock, and had run hard aground by the bow. There were no injuries or environmental pollution.

== Gallery ==
Mississagi

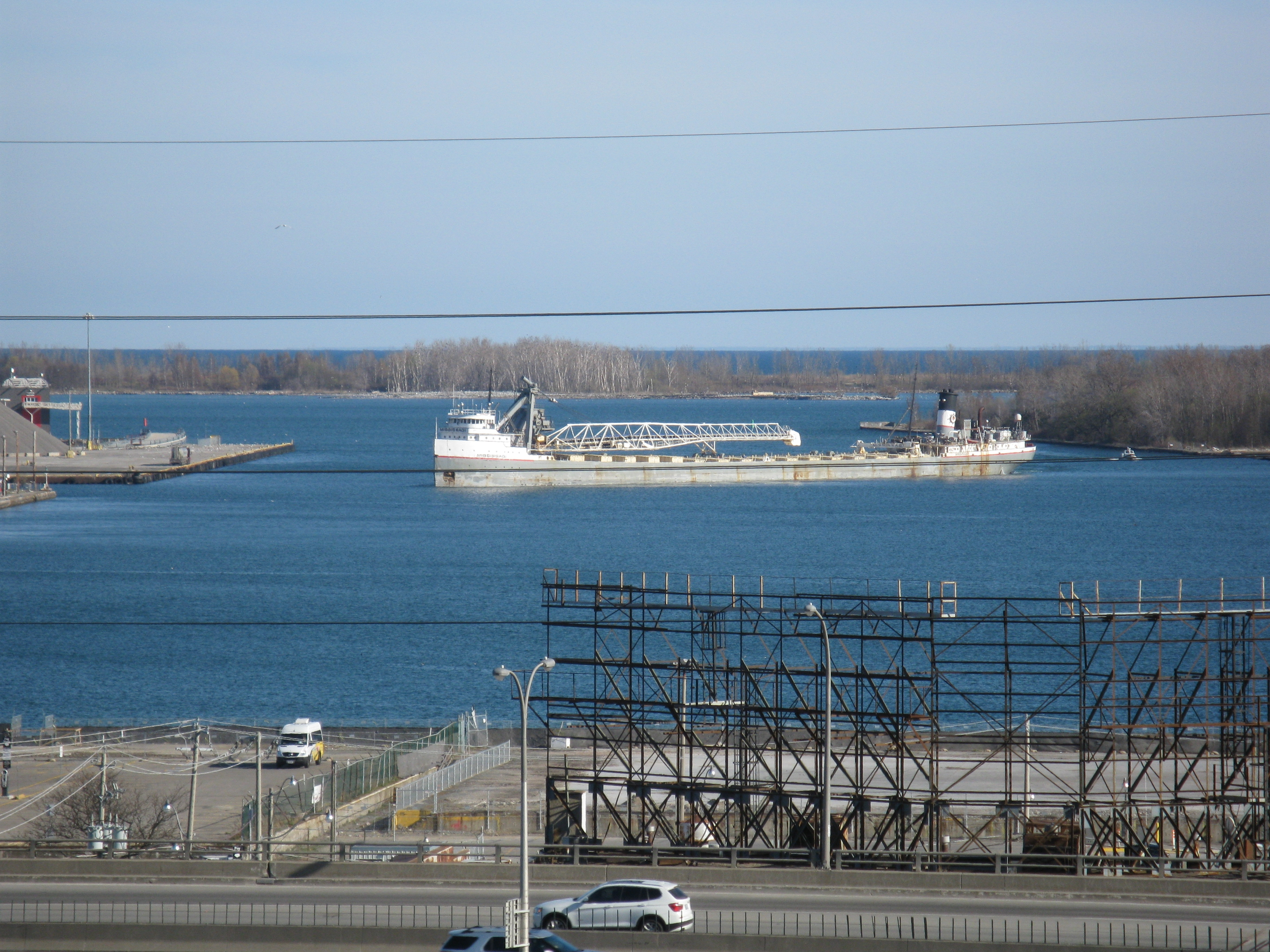
Laker Mississagi entering the channel to Toronto's turning basin

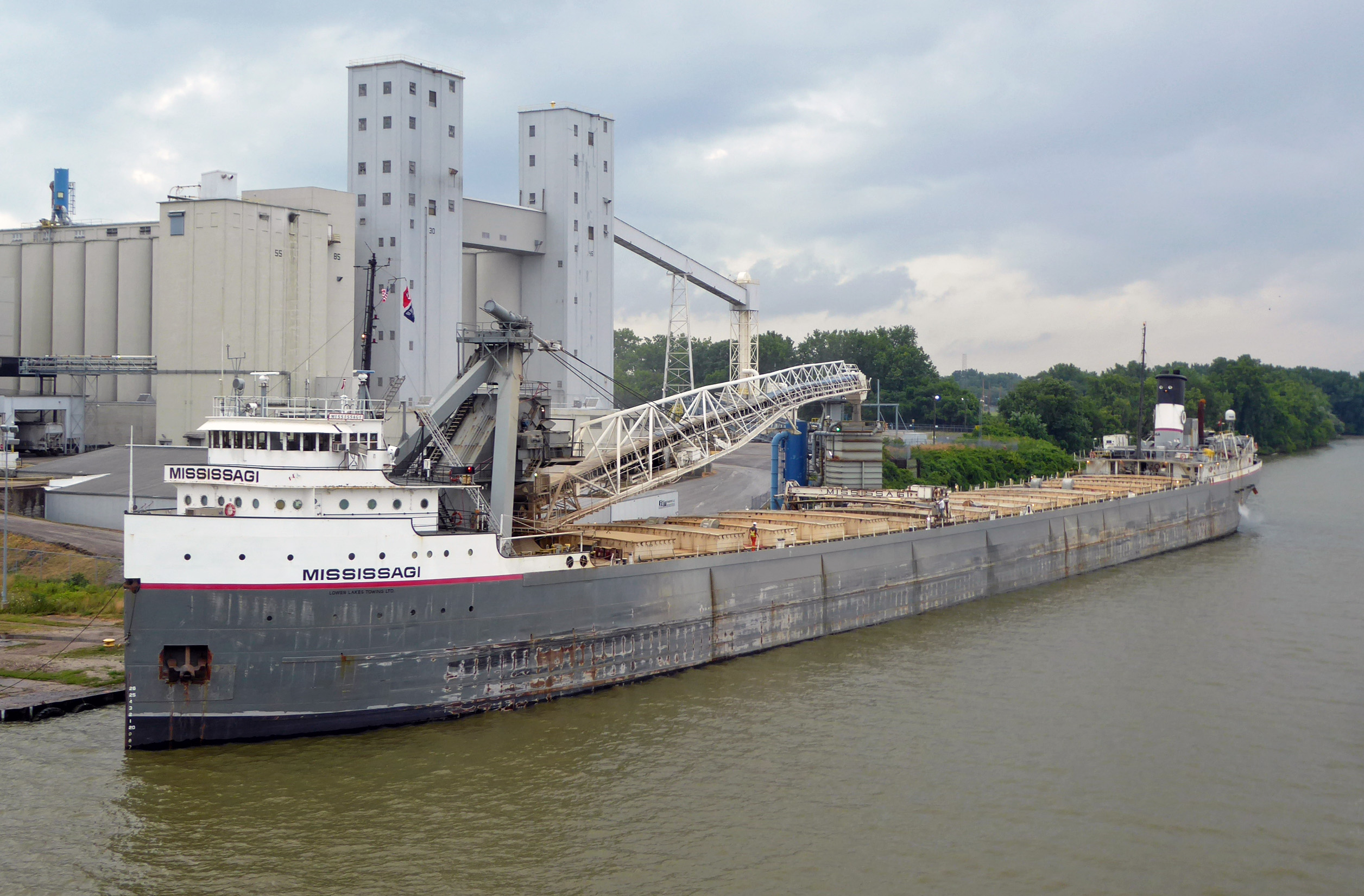
Mississagi at Toledo, July 2018

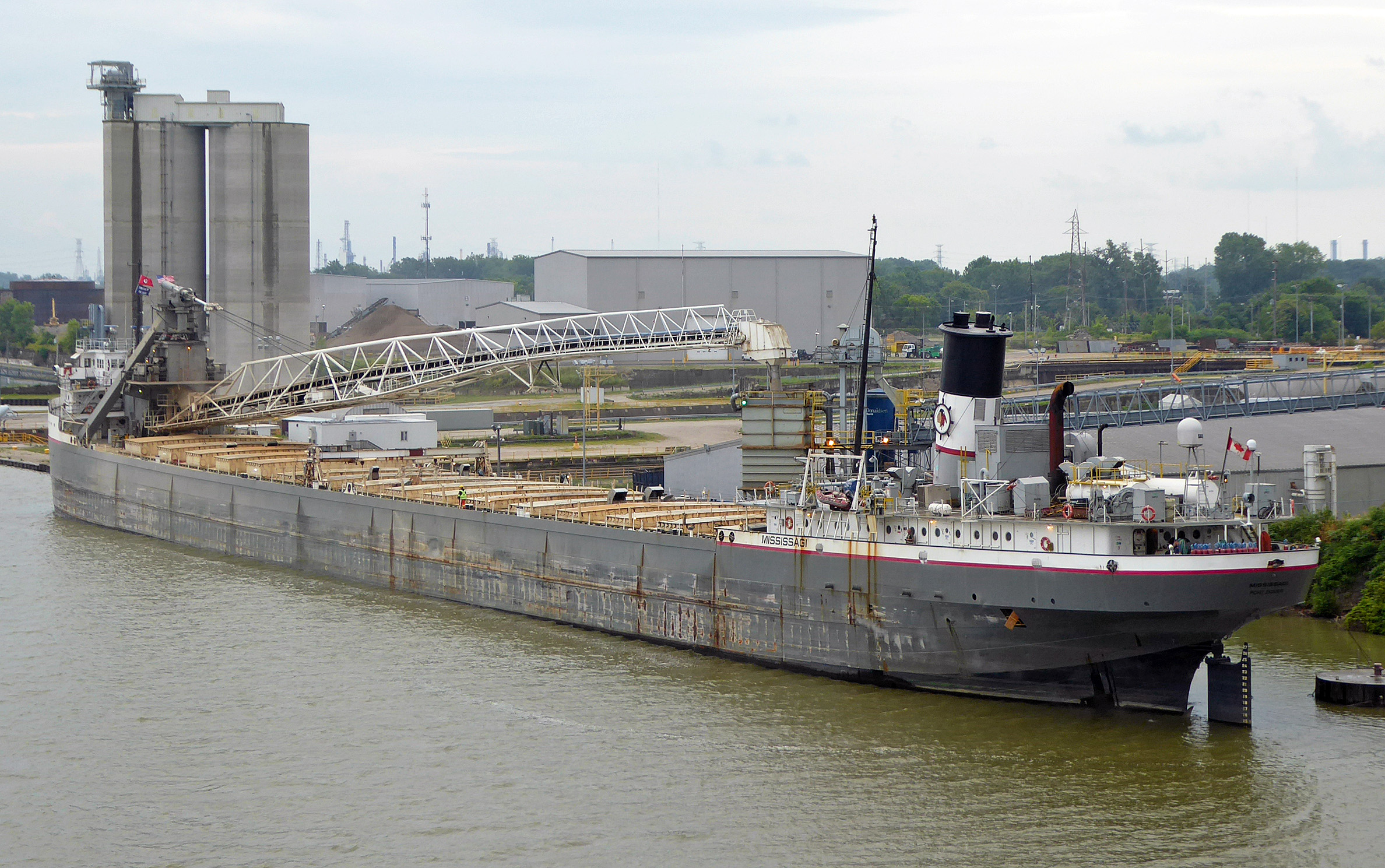
Mississagi at Toledo, July 2018
