= Type L6 ship =

Ship class

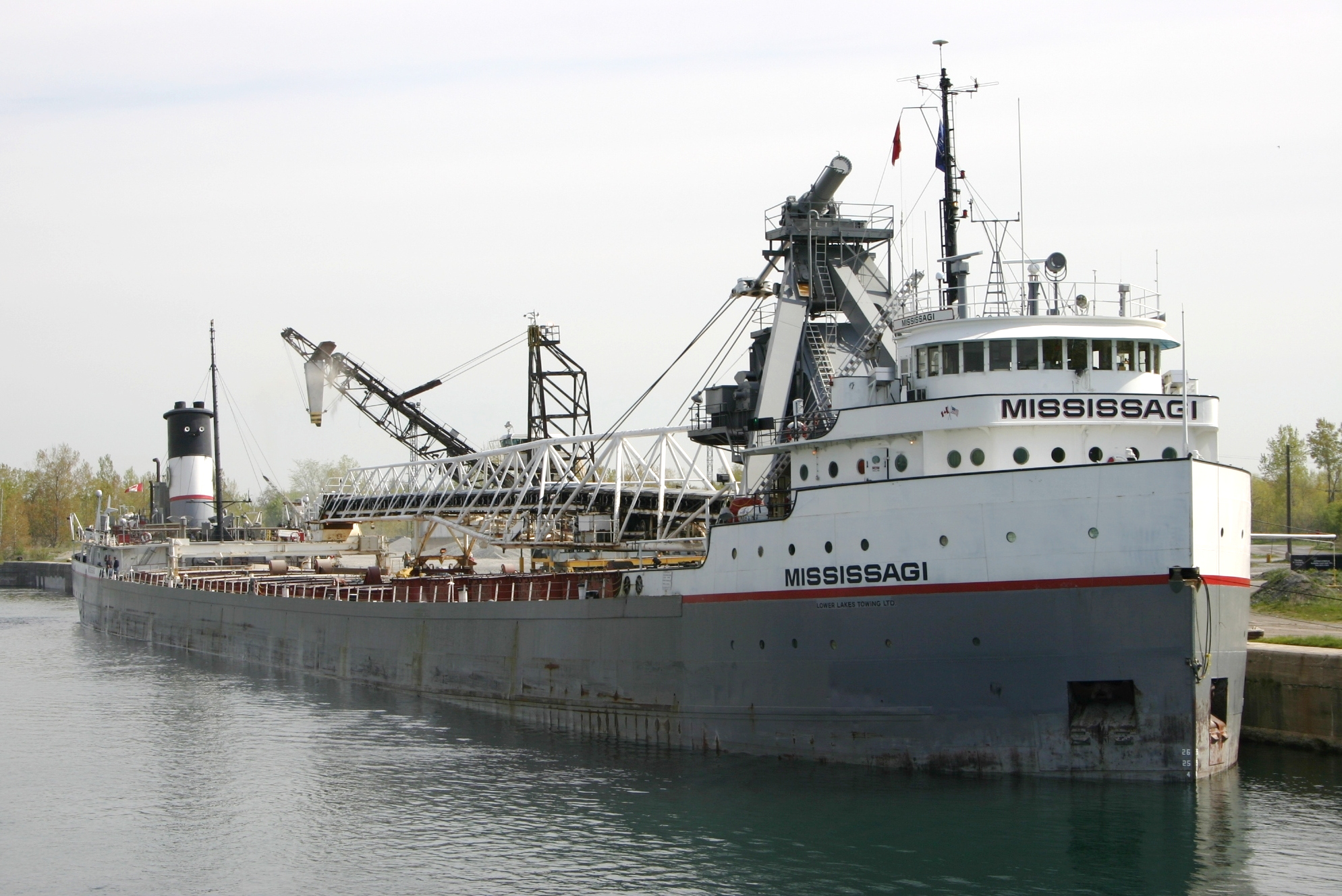
- SS Mississagi

Class overview
- Name: Type L6 ship
- Builders: American Ship Building Company and Great Lakes Engineering Works
- Built: 1943 (U.S. shipyards)
- In service: 1943 – 2024
- Completed: 16
- Laid up: 1
- Lost: 1
- Retired: 16

General characteristics
- Class & type: Maritimer class - L6
- Tonnage: 15,825 DWT
- Length: 620 ft 0 in (188.98 m) (design)
- Beam: 60 ft 0 in (18.29 m) (design)
- Depth: 35 ft 0 in (10.67 m) (design)
- Installed power: 2,500 shp triple expansion steam engine
- Propulsion: Two coal-fired water tube boilers *(some converted to diesel engine)

The Type L6 is a United States Maritime Administration (MARAD) designation for a class of lake freighters built during World War II. The class of 16 ships were commissioned by the United States Maritime Commission, and were built to carry iron ore for steel production in the United States and Canada in direct support of the war effort. All ships in the class had a deadweight tonnage of 15,675 tonnes. The Type L6's two sub-classes, the L6-S-A1 and the L6-S-B1, featured similar dimensions and cargo capacities, with different engines and stern designs.

Type L6 ships were built by the American Ship Building Company and the Great Lakes Engineering Works, and were completed between May and November 1943. All ships in the class remained in service after the war, with most operating until the 1980s. The final ship of the class, Cuyahoga (formerly J. Burton Ayers) remained in active service on the Great Lakes until 2024. In contemporary usage, the Type L6 ships are sometimes referred to as the Maritimer class.

== Specifications ==
- Dimensions: 620 feet
- Beam 60 feet
- GRT 9057
- NRT 6793
- Dwt 15,800
- Two coal-fired water tube boilers.
- L6-S-A1 type had Lenz 4 cylinder compound steam engine
- L6-S-B1 type had a 2,500 shp, 3 cylinder triple expansion steam engine

== Ships in Class ==
- L6-S-A1 Maritimer class
  - Thomas Wilson, Hull #826 USMC #565, Sank in 1987 off Bermuda while being towed to be scrapped.
  - Sewell Avery, Hull #827 USMC #566 Used as a dock at Sault Ste Marie, Ont. 1987
  - J. Burton Ayers, renamed Cuyahoga, Hull#828 USMC #567 To be scrapped at Port Colborne Ont.
  - E. G. Grace, renamed Lincolnshire, Hull #829 USMC #568, Scrapped 1984 at Port Colborne Ont.
  - Belle Isle, renamed Champlain, Hull #1009 USMC #569 Scrapped in Turkey October 1987
  - John T. Hutchinson, Hull #1010 USMC #570 Scrapped in Taiwan Oct 2, 1988
- L6-S-B1 Maritimer class
  - Adirondack, renamed Richard J. Reiss, then Manistee Hull #290 USMC #579 Converted to 2,950 horsepower diesel engine in 1976
  - Lake Angelina, renamed Cadillac, Hull #291 USMC #580 Scrap in 1962 at Hamilton Ont.
  - Hill Annex, renamed George A. Sloan then Mississagi Hull #292 USMC #581 Converted in 1984 to 4,500 bhp 12-cylinder diesel engine. Sent for scrap in 2021
  - Pilot Knob, renamed Frank Armstrong Hull #522 USMC #582 Scrapped in Turkey 1988.
  - Clarence B. Randall, Hull #523 USMC #583 Scrapped in Taiwan Oct 2, 1988
  - McIntyre, renamed Frank Purnell Hull #293 USMC #584 Used as barge, now laid up on the Calumet River.
  - Robert C. Stanley, Hull #294 USMC # 585 Scrapped in Turkey May,1989.
  - Lehigh, renamed Joseph X. Robert, then Willowglen, scrapped in 2006.

== Notable incidents ==
- SS Thomas Wilson After worked on the Lakes from 1943 to 1987. She was sold for scrap to Corostel Trading Co. of Montreal, Que. Canada in September 1987. Tugs were towing her to Taiwan for scrapping. On December 21, 1987, they hit a storm in the Atlantic Ocean and the towline broke. The Thomas Wilson sank 250 miles northeast of Bermuda, sank near 34 08'N by 61 35'12"W.
- SS Sewell Avery was sold 1986 to A. B. McLean Ltd., she was sunk in May 1987 to be used as part of a dock at Sault Ste. Marie, Ontario.
- J. Burton Ayers grounded at Stoneport, MI resulting on September 10, 1980, with much bottom damage, she was repaired. She was also grounded in the Detroit River, near the Renaissance Center, on May 8, 1981; she was released by three tugs.

== See also ==
- SS Edmund Fitzgerald
- Victory ships
- Liberty ship
- Type C1 ship
- Type C2 ship
- Type C3 ship
- United States Merchant Marine Academy
- List of auxiliaries of the United States Navy
