= SS Frank C. Ball =

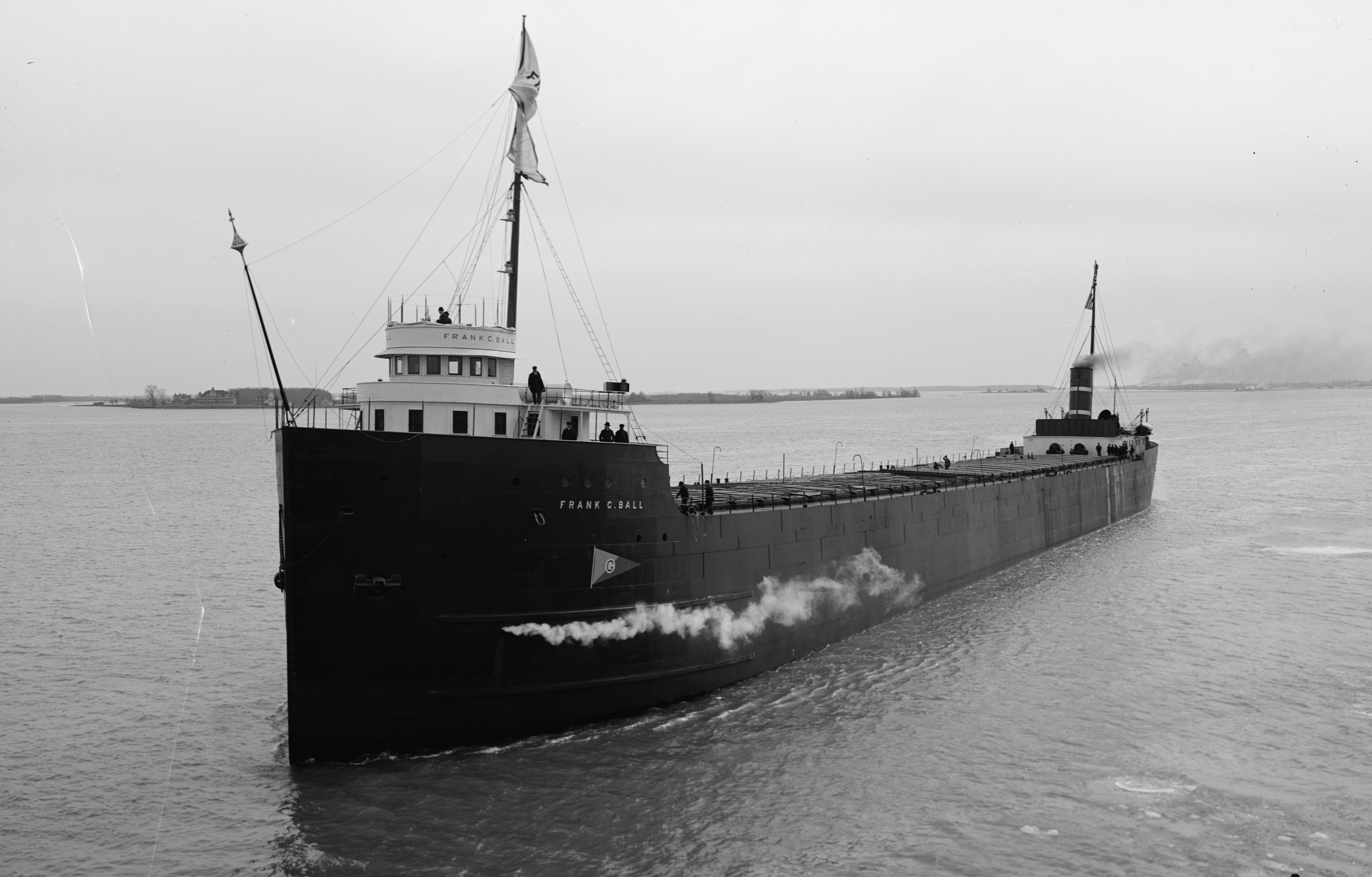
- The freighter Frank C. Ball on a trial run

History

United States
- Name: Frank C. Ball 1905-1931; J.R. Sensibar 1931-1981; Conallison 1981-1984
- Operator: Globe Steamship Company 1906-1930; Construction Materials Corporation 1930-1931; Sensibar Transportation Company 1931-1936; Midwest Vessel Corporation 1936-1937; Construction Aggregates Company 1937-1941; Columbia Transportation Company 1941-1957; Oglebay Norton Corporation 1957-1981; Johnstone Shipping Ltd. 1981-1981; Westdale Shipping Ltd. 1981-1984
- Port of registry: United States, Duluth, Minnesota 1905-1931; Gary, Indiana 1931-1939; Wilmington, Delaware 1936-1981; Toronto, Ontario 1981-1984
- Builder: Great Lakes Engineering Works, Ecorse, Michigan
- Yard number: 14
- Launched: December 9, 1905
- In service: 1906
- Out of service: 1984
- Identification: U.S. Registry #202770; IMO number: 5166938
- Fate: Scrapped in Avilés, Spain in 1984

General characteristics
- Class & type: Bulk Freighter
- Tonnage: 6,909 gross 5,459 net
- Length: 550 ft (170 m) 1905-1961 611 ft (186 m) 1961-1984
- Beam: 56.2 ft (17.1 m)
- Height: 32 ft (9.8 m)
- Installed power: 2 x Scotch marine boilers
- Propulsion: 1,700 horsepower triple expansion steam engine attached to a single fixed pitch propeller
- Speed: 10 knots

The Frank C. Ball was an American Bulk carrier that was built by the Great Lakes Engineering Works of Ecorse, Michigan, for the Globe Steamship Company (managed by G. A. Tomlinson, Mgr.) of Duluth, Minnesota. She was launched on December 9, 1905, as hull #14. She was powered by a 1,700 horsepower triple expansion steam engine and fueled by two coal-fired Scotch marine boilers. Even though Ball was built in 1905, she only entered service in 1906.

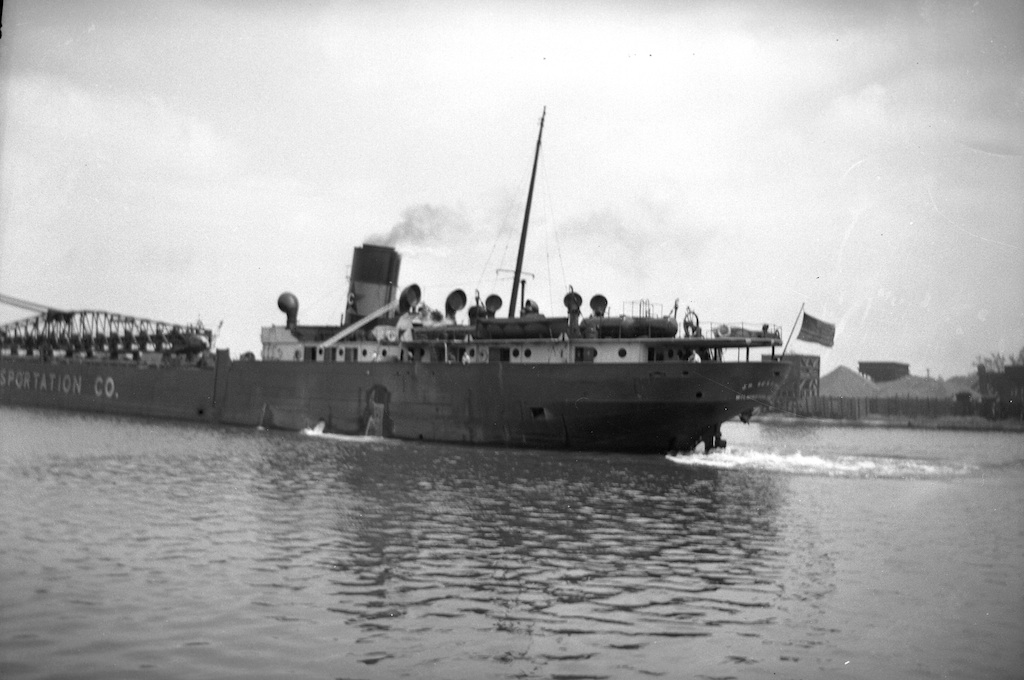
The Ball when she was named J.R. Sensibar

In 1930 the Ball was sold to the Construction Materials Corporation of Chicago, Illinois. She was converted to a self-unloading sand dredge, and repowered by a steam powered Turbo-electric engine at American Shipbuilding Company of Lorain, Ohio. She was the first commercial vessel on the lakes to use this form of propulsion. Her original engine was installed in the Ford Motor Company's former barge, the Lake Frugality, when she was requisitioned for salt water service in World War II.

== J.R. Sensibar ==
In 1931 the Ball was transferred to the Sensibar Transportation Company of Chicago, Illinois and renamed J.R. Sensibar. She was purchased to dredge the material for Chicago World's Fair. In 1936 the Sensibar was sold to the Midwest Vessel Corporation of Cleveland, Ohio where she served for only one year. In 1937 she was sold to the Construction Aggregates Company of Chicago, Illinois. In 1941 the Sensibar was sold to the Columbia Transportation Company of Cleveland, Ohio. She was converted to a self-unloading freighter that same year. In 1957 the fleet owned by Columbia Transportation Company merged with the Oglebay Norton Corporation. In 1960 the Sensibar had a new diesel engine installed, she also had her cargo hatches raised by Christy Corporation of Sturgeon Bay, Wisconsin. In 1961 the Sensibar was lengthened to 611 feet (186 meters) by American Shipbuilding Company of South Chicago, Illinois.

In 1981 the Sensibar was sold to Johnstone Shipping Ltd. of Toronto, Ontario affiliate of Ship Repairs & Supplies Ltd., and renamed Conallison. She was primarily used for carrying coal from Lake Erie ports to ports on the St. Lawrence River. She did not operate through the 1982 shipping season.

== Layup ==
In 1983 the Conallison was laid up and sold for scrap to Marine Salvage Ltd. of Port Colborne, Ontario. She was later resold to a Spanish scrapyard, leaving Quebec with the steamer George M. Carl towed by the Polish tug Koral. The vessels arrived in Avilés, Spain on September 17, 1984.
