= Samuel F. Hodge & Company =

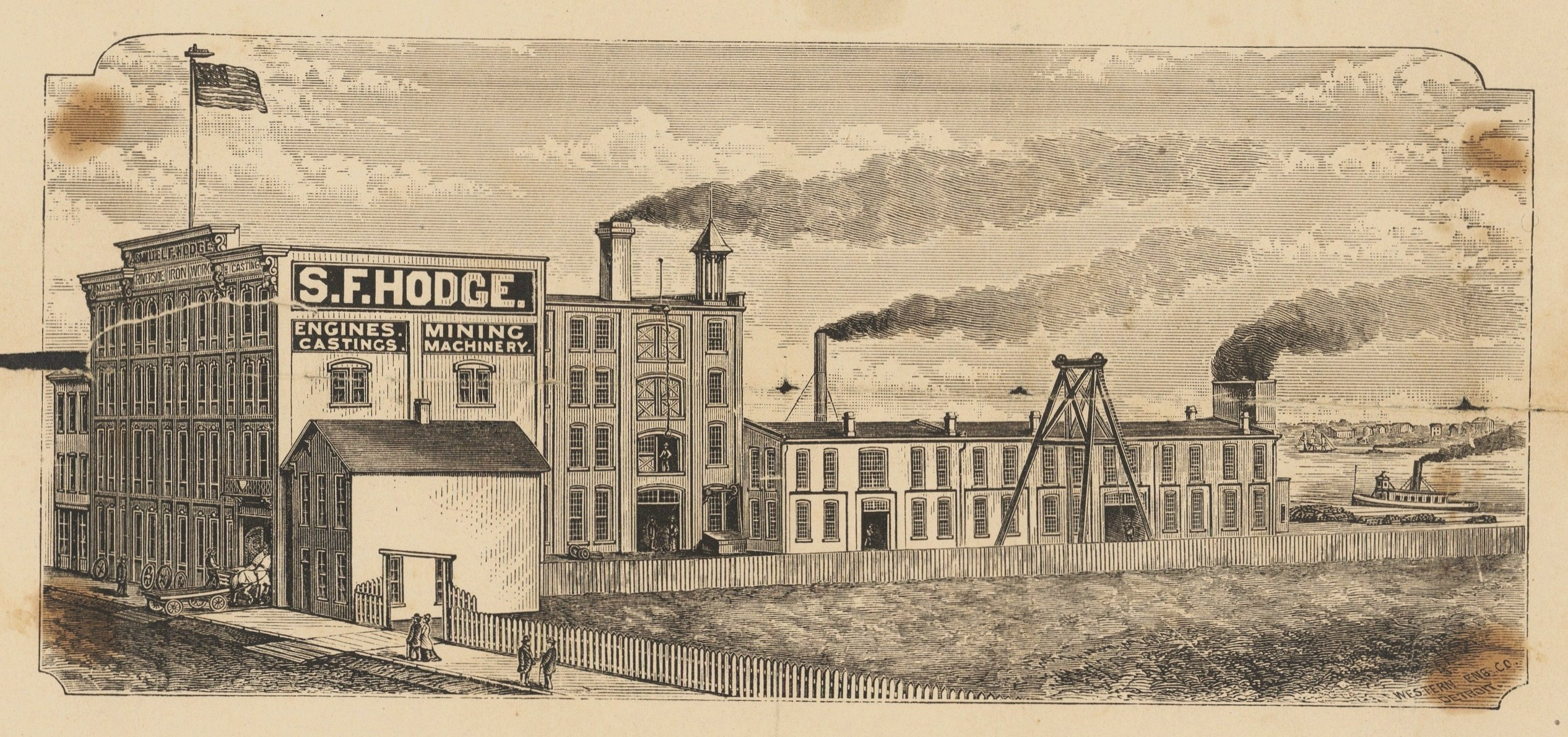
- Samuel F. Hodge & Company, ca. 1886
- Company type: Private
- Industry: Engineering; Manufacturing
- Predecessor: Cowie, Hodge & Co.; Hodge & Christie
- Founded: 1863 (as Cowie, Hodge & Co.)
- Founders: Samuel F. Hodge; William Cowie; Thomas S. Christie; William Barclay
- Defunct: ca. 1899
- Fate: Acquired
- Successors: Riverside Iron Works; Great Lakes Engineering Works
- Headquarters: Detroit, Michigan, United States
- Products: Marine steam engines

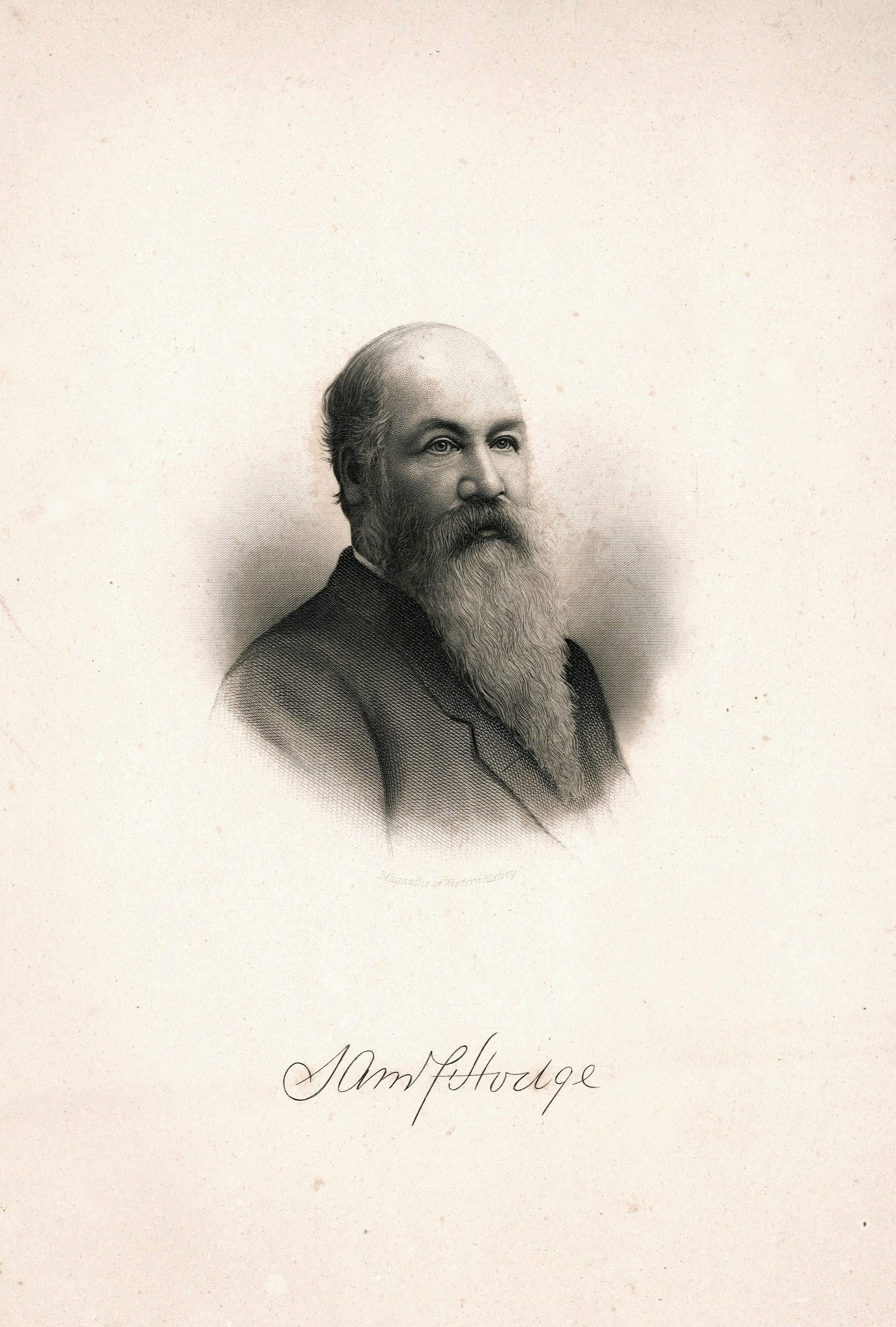
Samuel F. Hodge, Samuel F. Hodge & Company, Detroit, Michigan. Appeared in Magazine of Western History, 1886

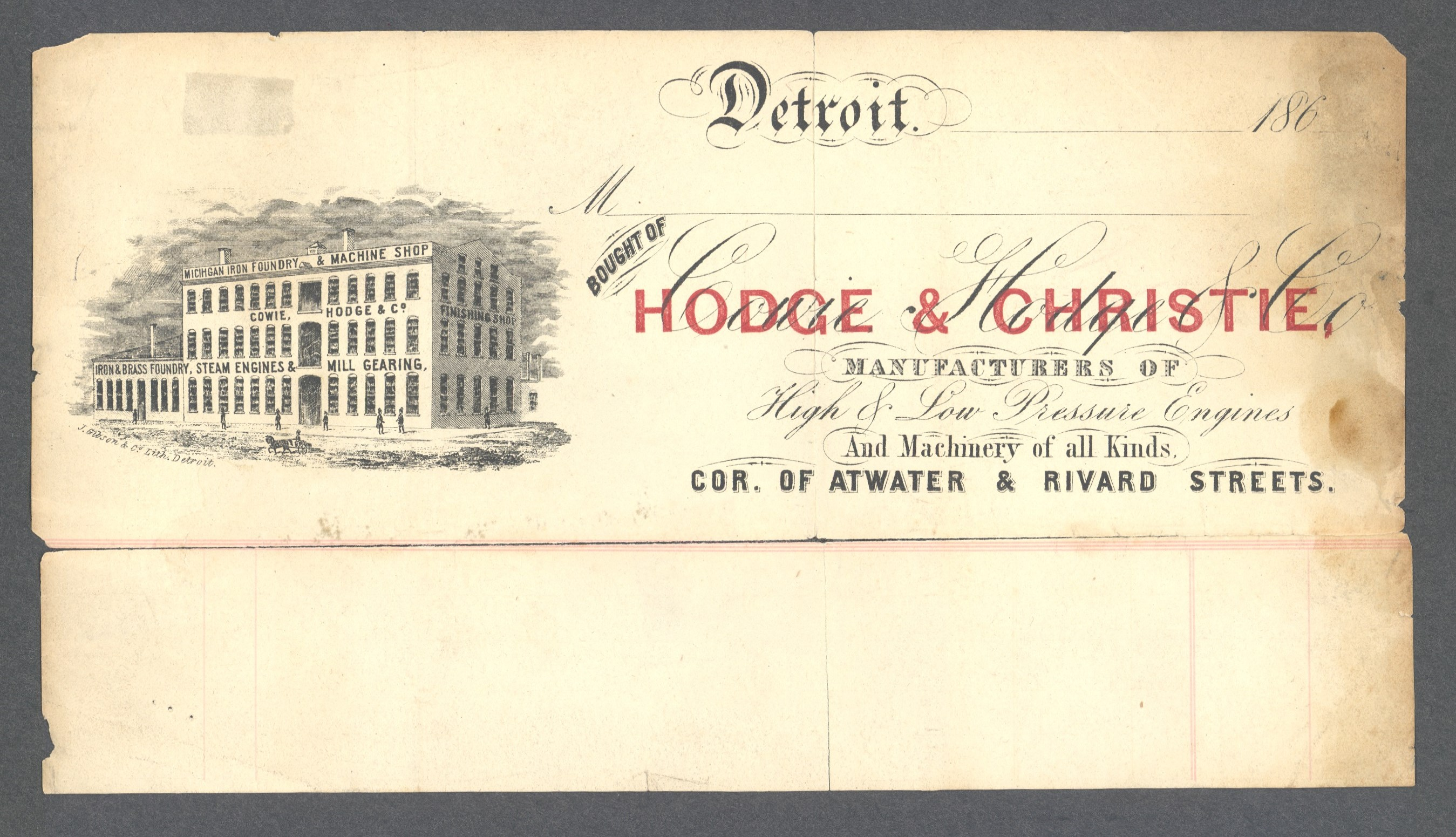
Hodge & Christie, 1865-1870, Detroit, Michigan

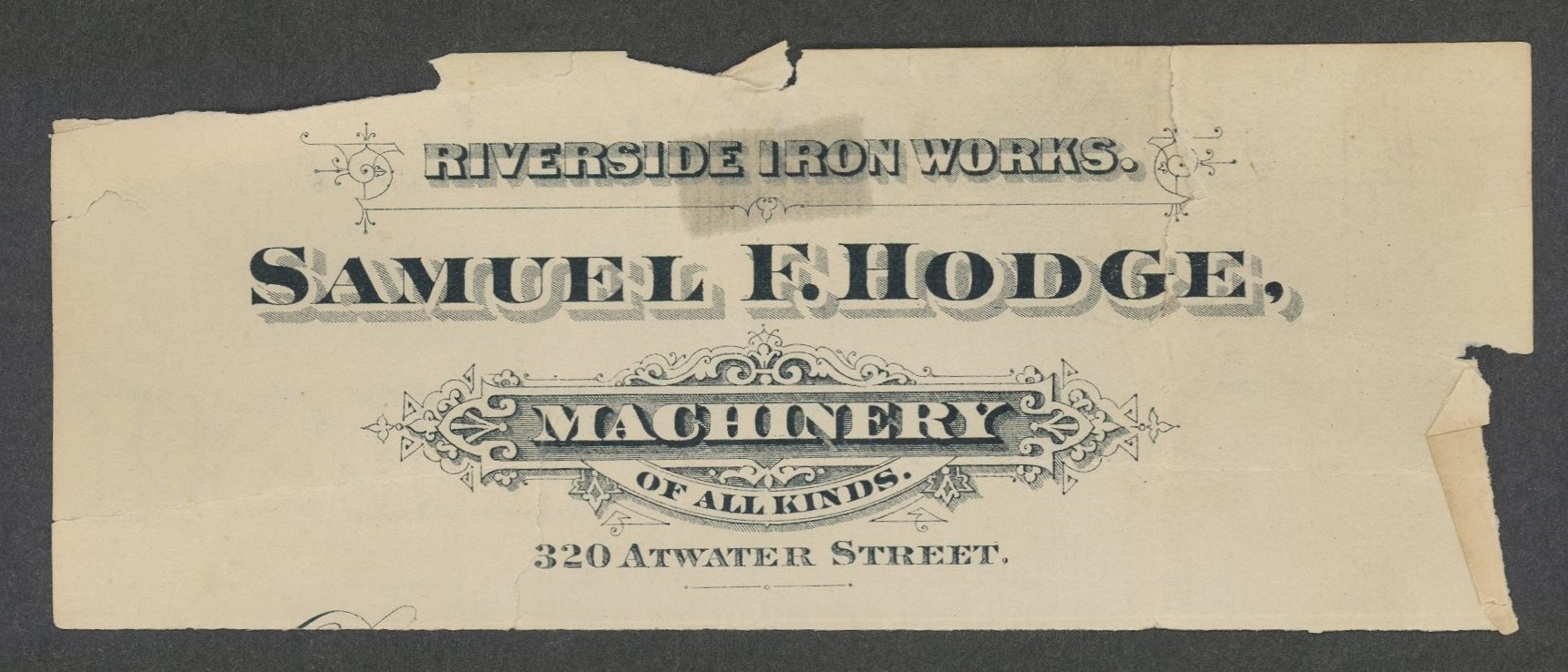
Riverside Iron Works, Samuel F. Hodge, Detroit, Michigan Riverside was purchased by Great Lakes Engineering Works in 1902.

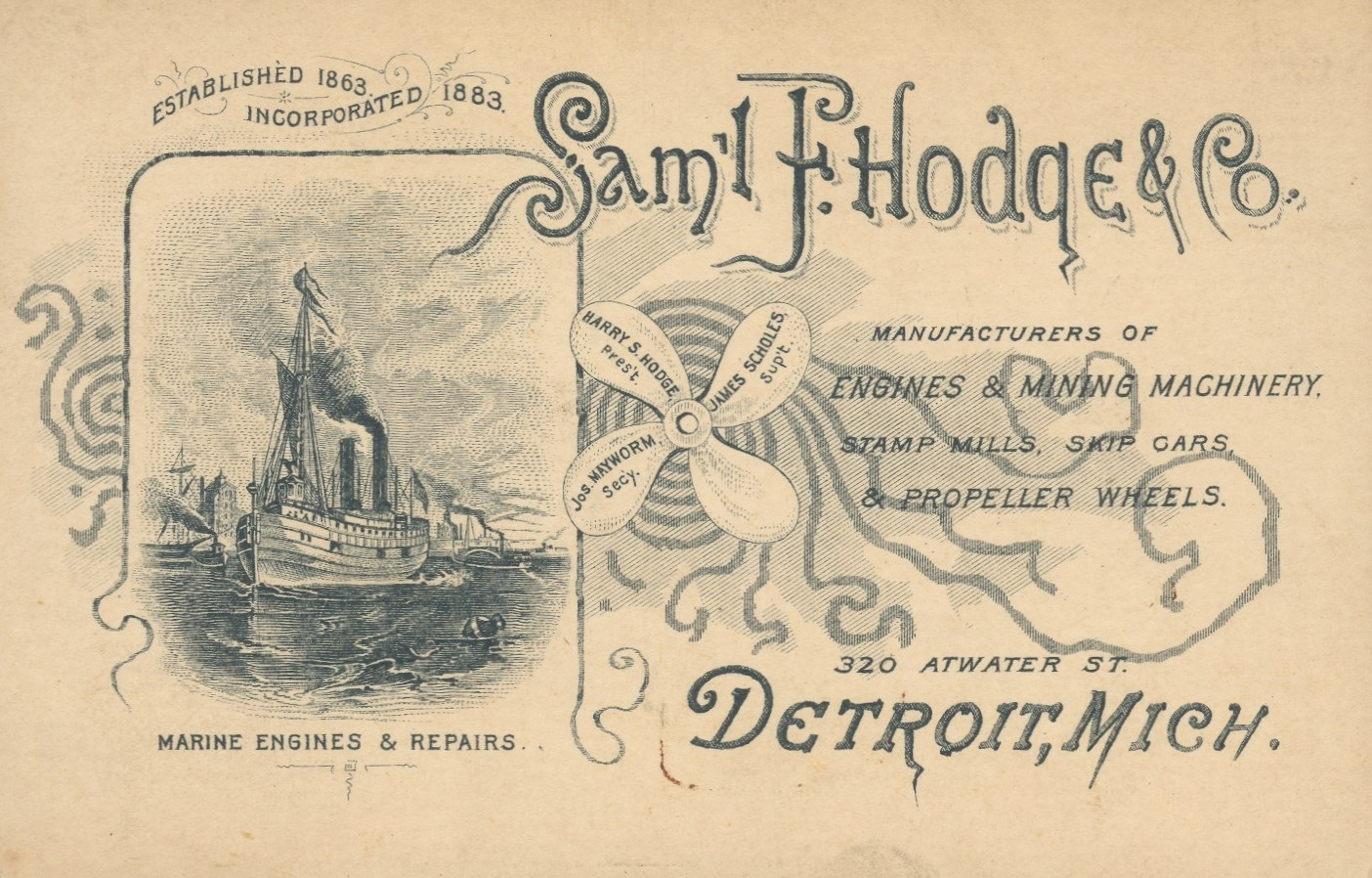
Samuel F. Hodge & Company. Established in 1863, Incorporated in 1883. Detroit, Michigan

Samuel F. Hodge & Company was a manufacturer of marine engines in Detroit. Originally established in 1863 under the name of Cowie, Hodge & Co. In 1865, the firm became Hodge & Christie. In 1870, Mr. Hodge bought the interest of Mr. Christie and continued the business individually. In 1876, during the worst of the depression following the crash of 1873, Samuel F. Hodge built one of the most convenient manufacturing establishments in Detroit, S.F. Hodge & Company, equipping it with a plant second to none. In 1883 it was incorporated as the Samuel F. Hodge & Company. Samuel F. Hodge retained the presidency until his death. They turned out 125 engines between 1884 and 1899. They built the first triple expansion engine to be used on the Great Lakes. It was placed in the Roumania on October 2, 1886. Here also was built the engine for Capt. Hoyt, the first of Capt. Alexander Mc Dougall's whaleback steamers built at West Superior. The engine in the whaleback steamer, Westmore, which attracted much attention in Liverpool when she crossed the Atlantic, was a product of these shops. The great whaleback excursion steamer Christopher Columbus, employed at the World's Fair, received her engine from Samuel F. Hodge & Co. This was said to be the largest single engine of its class on the lakes. Samuel F. Hodge & Co. was located at 308 to 326 Atwater St. East, in Detroit.

Because of the Hodge Company and other companies like them, the Detroit River community had become a hot bed for steam engine development. In 1883, Samuel F. Hodge & Co. was renamed the Riverside Iron Works. In 1902, the Riverside Works was purchased by a group of industrialists and renamed the Great Lakes Engineering Works.
