= SS Superior City =

Freighter in the Great Lakes service that sank in Lake Superior

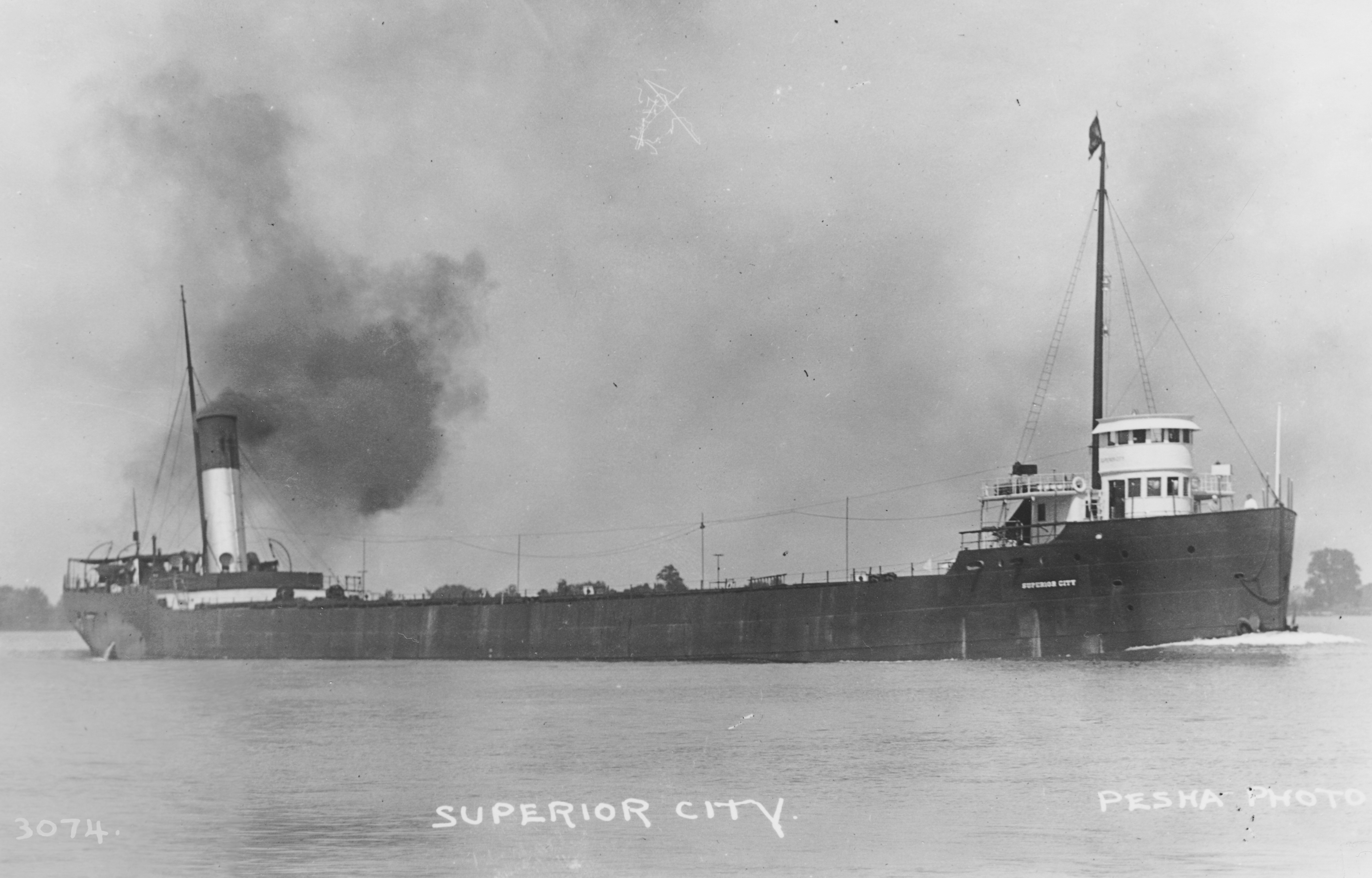
- Superior City, sometime prior to 1912.

History
- Name: Superior City
- Owner: American Steamship Company 1898 – 1901; Pittsburg Steamship Company 1901 – 1920
- Port of registry: Cleveland, Ohio (United States)
- Builder: Cleveland Shipbuilding Company, Lorain, Ohio
- Launched: 13 April 1898
- Completed: 1898
- Identification: United States Registry # 116820
- Fate: Sank in Whitefish Bay 20 August 1920 after colliding with Willis L. King
- Notes: First vessel launched from the Lorain shipyard of the Cleveland Ship Building Co.

General characteristics
- Type: Bulk freighter, propeller
- Tonnage: 3,693 NRT; 4,785 GRT
- Length: 450 ft (140 m)
- Beam: 50 ft (15 m)
- Height: 25 ft (7.6 m)
- Propulsion: Propeller, 1,900 hp (1,400 kW) engine
- Crew: 33

SS Superior City was considered a pioneer vessel at her launching in 1898. She was the largest vessel ever built on freshwater at that time. She sailed the Great Lakes for twenty-two years until she sank after a collision in 1920 with the steamer Willis L. King in Whitefish Bay of Lake Superior that resulted in the loss of 29 lives. Controversy was immediate over the collision. It was subsequently ruled that the captains of both ships failed to follow the "rules-of-the-road." Controversy started again in 1988 when the Great Lakes Shipwreck Historical Society produced a video called "Graveyard of the Great Lakes" that included extensive footage of the skeletons of the Superior City crew. The controversy continued as late as 1996 over artifacts removed from her wreck. She is now a protected shipwreck in the Whitefish Point Underwater Preserve.

== History ==
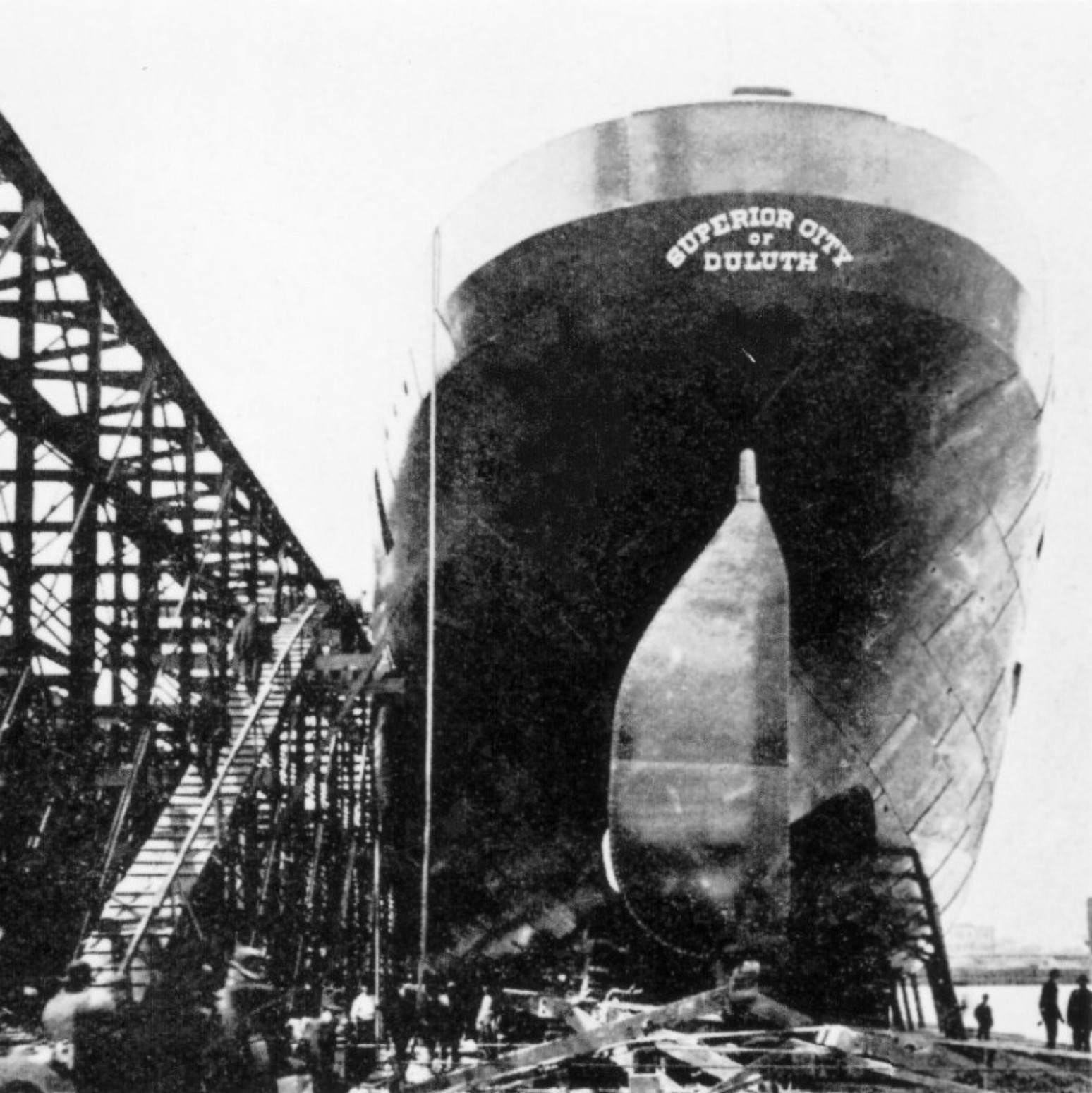
Superior City on the ways prior to her launch

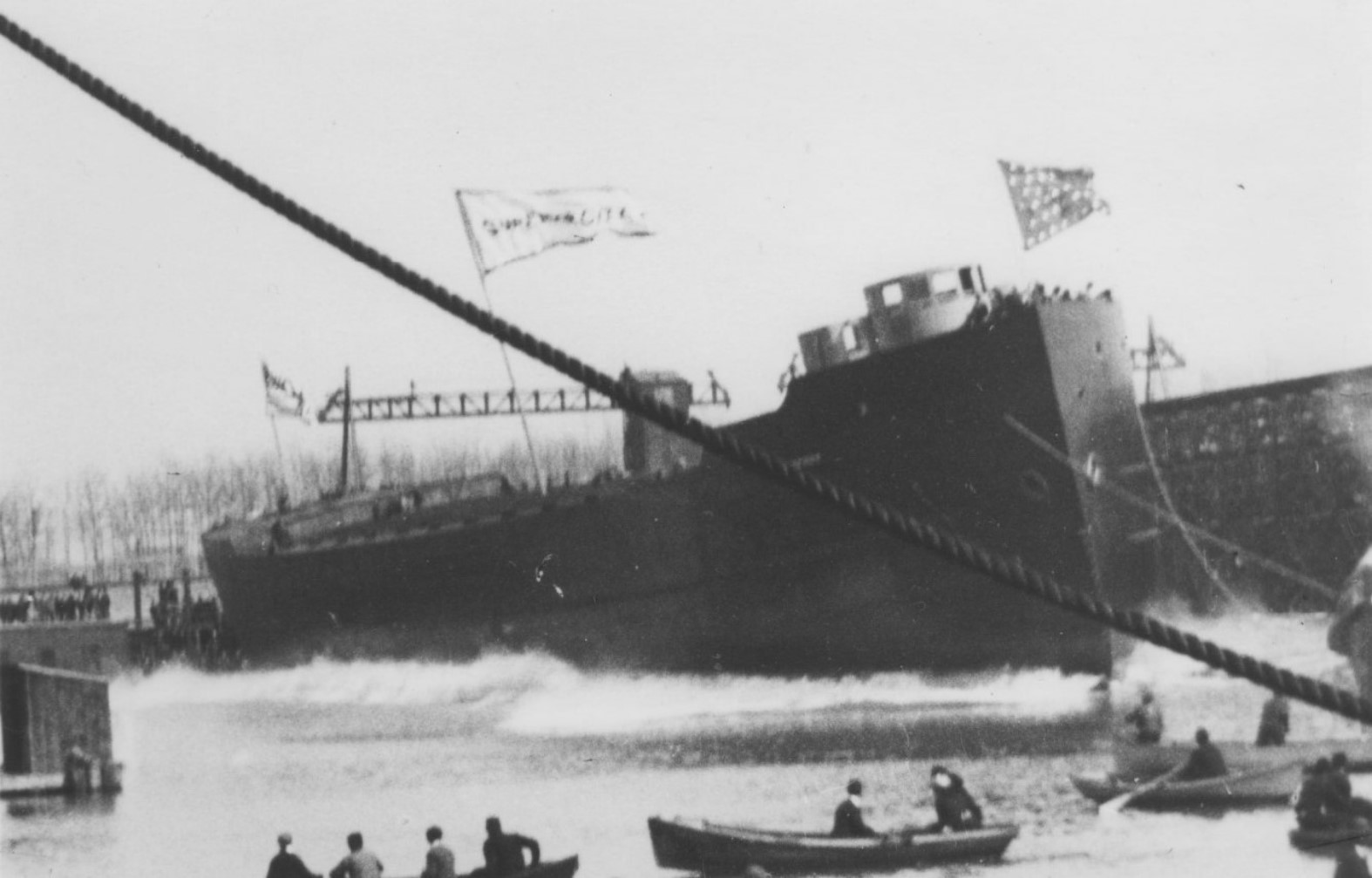
Launching of the Superior City

The Superior City was launched on 13 April 1898 at the yards of the Cleveland Ship Building Company (later named the American Ship Building Company) in Lorain, Ohio. Superior City was a pioneer vessel representing the steady progression of bigger, longer, and stronger craft from the days of ships powered by sails. At her launching, she was the largest vessel ever built on freshwater. The whole town of Lorain crowded the river front to watch her launch.

On April 26, 1909, Dr. Griffin, the local health officer at Sault Ste. Marie, Michigan received reports that boats tied up at the Soo Locks had been quarantined and a couple of the lockmen said that they heard that the Superior City had displayed a smallpox sign for a few hours on the previous night. Dr. Griffin boarded Superior City and had a heated conference in which everyone denied any knowledge of a smallpox sign. Dr. Griffin issued a warning that any misuse of a contagious disease sign would be immediately reported to the Michigan Secretary of State. Shipwreck historian Wes Oleszewski reported, "In the ensuing days, there were far fewer uninvited guests aboard any of the boats tied up at the Soo Locks, especially Superior City."

The Superior City sailed the lakes for twenty-two years before she came to an untimely end in the worst collision ever occurring on Lake Superior.

== Collision ==
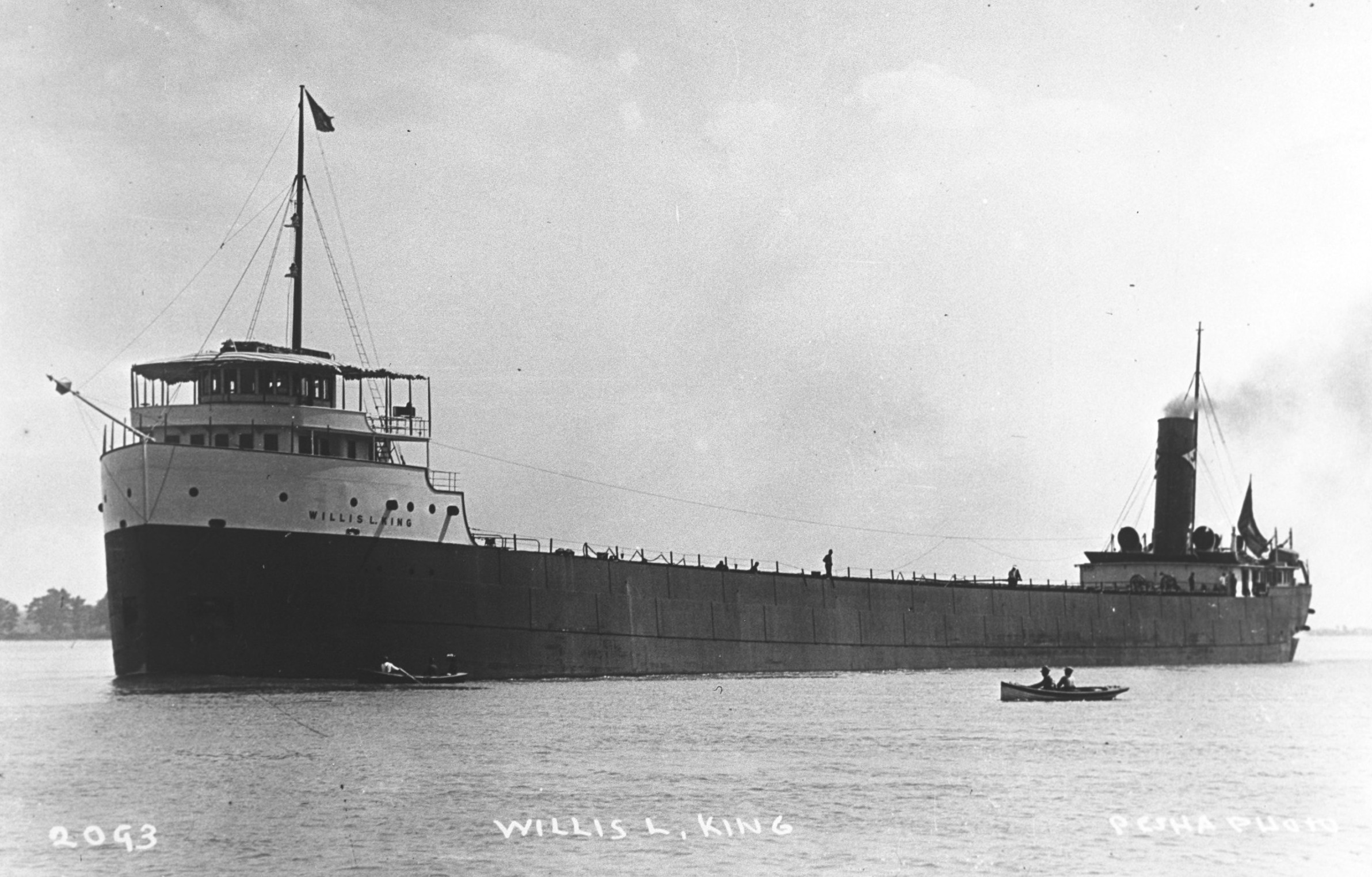
Willis L. King prior to her collision with Superior City

At 9:10 PM on 20 August 1920, the steamers Superior City and Willis L. King collided in Whitefish Bay on Lake Superior. Superior City was downbound and heavy with 7,600 tons of iron ore loaded at Two Harbors, Minnesota. The steamer Willis L. King was upbound and light after unloading ore at Ashtabula, Ohio. Maritime historian Boyer wrote that Superior City was, "[R]ammed on her port side, aft of midships … [causing] … a tremendous explosion when the terrible inrushing wall of cold water burst her aft bulkheads and hit the boilers. The vessel's stern was literally blown off…. [and she] was nearly halved in the collision." Immediately following the collision, the crew was struggling to lower the lifeboats that were located over the boilers and this concentrated them precisely over the explosion, resulting in the loss of life of most of the crew.

=== Casualties and survivors ===
The Superior City sank rapidly with the loss of lives of 28 men and one woman, the worst loss of life in the history of the Pittsburg Steamship Company. Of the four survivors, Captain Sawyer, second mate G. G. Lehnt, and watchman Peter Jacobsen were forward and jumped for their lives. Captain Sawyer was found clinging to a life preserver that he never had time to put on. Second mate Lehnt was found clinging to the bottom of a capsized lifeboat. Watchman Jacobson fought his way back to the surface after being dragged down with the ship and swam for about 20 minutes until Willis L. King's lifeboat picked him up. Boatswain Walter Richter was sleeping in his bunk wearing only long underwear when alarm bells sounded. When he raced to the deck, the explosion blew him overboard, blowing off his underwear. The steamer J.J. Turner picked him up clinging to a hatch cover that he rode as a raft. Crewmembers on the J.J. Turner reported that wooden ports in the interior of the ship had been blown through her steel sides. Most of the crewmembers were likely blown to pieces by the boiler explosion or were trapped in the suction of the powerful whirlpool when the Superior City sank. No bodies were ever recovered.

== Investigation ==
The vessels sighted each other about ten minutes before the collision and exchanged steam whistle signals. Captain Sawyer of Superior City and Captain Nelson of Willis L. King offered conflicting statements about the weather and the whistle signals prior to the collision. Captain Sawyer said that the weather was clear at the time of the accident while Captain Nelson said that the night had been foggy and hazy. Captain Sawyer maintained that the two vessels exchanged one blast signals indicating the conventional port-to-port passing signal. Captain Nelson asserted that the vessels exchanged two blast signals for a starboard-to-starboard passing. At the time impact, Superior City was swinging across the Willis L. King's bow while Captain Nelson swung his bow hard aport and rang the telegraph to stop and then full astern. The estimated speed at the time of impact was 12 miles per hour (19 km/h) for Willis L. King, and 10.5 miles per hour (16.9 km/h) for the Superior City. The incident was investigated by U.S. Steamboat Inspectors Gooding and Hanson of Marquette, Michigan. After their initial statements, both captains communicated only in depositions to the proctors-in-admiralty representatives of the owners of the vessels. Officers and crew of the nearby J.J. Turner and Midvale witnessed the collision and heard the exchange of passing signals. It was determined that although very early in the night there had been haze and some fog, at the time of the collision the night was crystal clear with unlimited visibility. When Willis L. King made to the Superior Shipbuilding Company's drydock for repairs of a twisted, broken stern, seventeen shell plates and frames destroyed, interior forward decks buckled, and numerous angles and stringers that required replacement, Captain Nelson ordered that no member of the crew was to discuss the incident with anyone but representatives of the vessel's owner or agents.

=== Rulings ===
After many months of investigation and litigation, United States District Court, the Western District of Wisconsin Judge C. Z. Luce ruled that both masters were guilty of failing to follow the "Rules of the Road" regulations that if there is doubt about the course or intention of the other, the pilot is required give the danger signal and slow to a speed barely sufficient for passageway and/or stop and reverse course. After more haggling by underwriters and proctors, Superior City was valued at $300,000 and her tonnage was valued at $42,922.95. Willis L. King's damage was $42,520. The loss-of-life claims were not paid until late in 1923. The lawyers of victim's estates had little muscle against the legal maneuverings of the admiralty proctors and they settled for $5,000 to the families of deckhands and porters, $3,700 for the wife of the second engineer, $11,205 for the second engineer, and $25,000 for the chief engineer.

== Wreck controversy ==
The wreck of Superior City was initially discovered in 1972 by diver John Steele. The wreck was rediscovered in 1980 by Tom Farnquist and Gary Shumbarger of the Great Lakes Shipwreck Historical Society who extensively photographed the wreck. The Shipwreck Society produced a video in 1988 about the wreck of Superior City called "Graveyard of the Great Lakes" that showed extensive footage of skeletons of the crew and the removal of a wedding ring from a skeleton. The Shipwreck Society still claims accolades for the "Graveyard of the Great Lakes" video but they no longer sell it to the public.

The Evening News reported a Michigan Department of Natural Resources and Environment raid on the Great Lakes Shipwreck Museum and its offices that found evidence of 150 artifacts illegally removed from the state-claimed bottomlands. Artifacts from Superior City and other shipwrecks are on display at the Great Lakes Shipwreck Museum as a loan from the state following a 1993 settlement agreement with the Michigan Department of State and Department of Natural Resources.

The controversy surrounding artifacts from Superior City continued in 1996 over the ownership of her telegraph. The telegraph was on loan to the Great Lakes Shipwreck Museum. When the owner's representative, Great Lakes shipwreck diver Steve Harrington, removed the telegraph from the museum, the museum's director, Tom Farnquist, notified the Michigan State Police who held the telegraph until ownership was determined. Both men admitted that the controversy really stemmed from proposed legislation over the photography of dead bodies in Michigan waters that included the wrecks of Superior City and SS Edmund Fitzgerald.

For a number of years the Great Lakes Shipwreck Historical Society used a wedding ring from a skeleton on Superior City to promote its museum. In a 2000 interview Farnquist likened the identity of the skeleton and the owner of the wedding ring to a shipwreck mystery that may never be solved. The ring and other artifacts from Superior City are still on display in the Great Lakes Shipwreck Museum.

== Wreck diving ==
Scuba diving to the Superior City wreck requires advanced technical diving skills as it is among the most dangerous and difficult dives among the many wrecks in Whitefish Bay. A diver lost his life while exploring the Superior City wreck in 2001. His body was retrieved from the wreck in 230 feet (70 m) of water by the robotic arm of a remote vehicle.

The wreck of Superior City lies in 190 to 270 feet (58 to 82 m) of water in Whitefish Bay of Lake Superior at 46°43.51′N 84°52.37′W. The Superior City wreck is protected for future generations by the Whitefish Point Underwater Preserve as part of an underwater museum.
