= SS Thomas F. Cole =

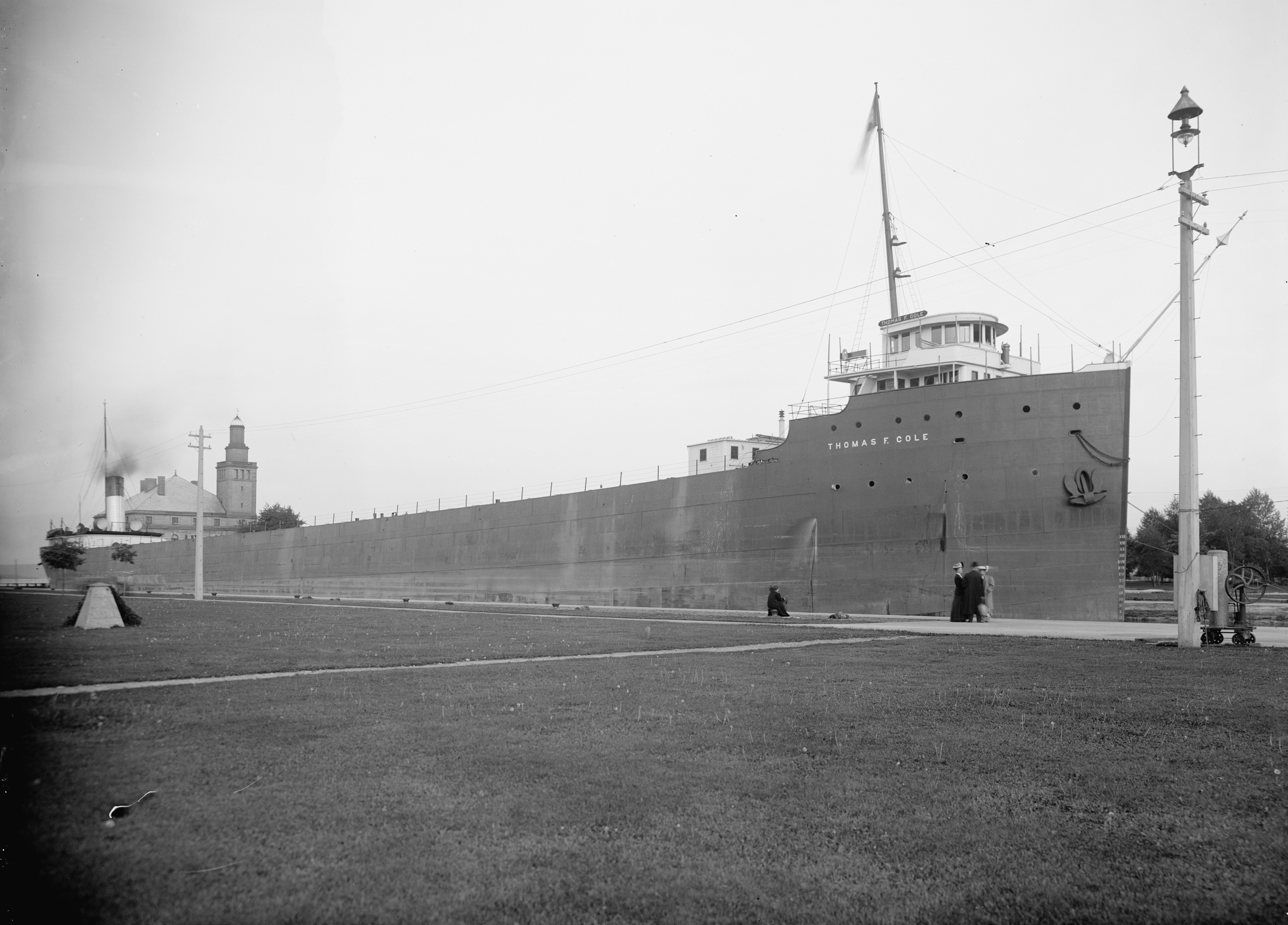
- The Thomas F. Cole in Poe Lock

History

United States
- Name: Thomas F. Cole
- Namesake: Thomas F. Cole
- Operator: Pittsburgh Steamship Company (1907-1952); U.S. Steel (1952-1980)
- Port of registry: United States, Duluth, Minnesota (1907-1949); Wilmington, Delaware (1949-1951); New York (1951-1967); Wilmington, Delaware (1967-1980)
- Builder: Great Lakes Engineering Works, Ecorse, Michigan
- Yard number: 27
- Launched: January 26, 1907
- Completed: 1907
- In service: May 26, 1907
- Out of service: 1980
- Identification: U.S. Registry #203891
- Fate: Scrapped in 1980, in Thunder Bay
- Notes: In 1913 the Cole collided with the barge Iron City

General characteristics
- Tonnage: 7,268 gross 5,484 net
- Length: 605.6 ft (184.6 m)
- Beam: 58 ft (18 m)
- Height: 32 ft (9.8 m)
- Installed power: 2× Scotch marine boilers
- Propulsion: 1,880 horsepower triple expansion steam engine
- Speed: 10 knots
- Capacity: 12,370 tons

The SS Thomas F. Cole was a 605.6 ft (184.6 m) long Great Lakes freighter built in 1907 for the Pittsburgh Steamship Company by the Great Lakes Engineering Works of Ecorse, Michigan. The boat was named after mining mogul Thomas F. Cole. She was launched as hull #27 on January 26, 1907. She was powered by a 2,000 horsepower triple expansion steam engine which was attached to a single fixed pitch propeller. She was powered by two coal-fired scotch marine boilers. She had a top speed of ten knots. She entered service on May 26, 1907 (homeport Duluth, Minnesota). She arrived for her first load of iron ore on May 29, 1907.

On August 24, 1910 the Cole suffered severe damage when she ran aground in the St. Marys River. The Cole collided with the barge Iron City on May 13, 1913, on Lake St. Clair cutting her in two and sinking her.

In April 1946 the Cole had new hopper side tanks installed. In 1947 the Cole had two new coal-fired Babcock & Wilcox water tube boilers.

== Transfer to U.S. Steel ==
In 1952 the Cole was transferred to U.S. Steel of Cleveland, Ohio. In April 1957 the Cole had a new tank top installed. On November 24, 1964 the Cole had a collision with the British vessel MV Inverewe in foggy conditions off the south end of Pipe Island, on the lower St. Marys River. The Cole suffered severe damage to her bow. She later arrived at the American Shipbuilding Company of Lorain, Ohio for repairs.

== Scrapping ==
In 1974 the Cole was laid up in Duluth, Minnesota never to sail again. In 1980 the Cole was sold to the Western Metals Corp. of Thunder Bay for scrap. She arrived in Thunder Bay on July 31, 1980 towed by the tugs Daryl C. Hannah and Malcolm
