= Great Lakes Engineering Works =

Former Wayne County, Michigan shipbuilding company

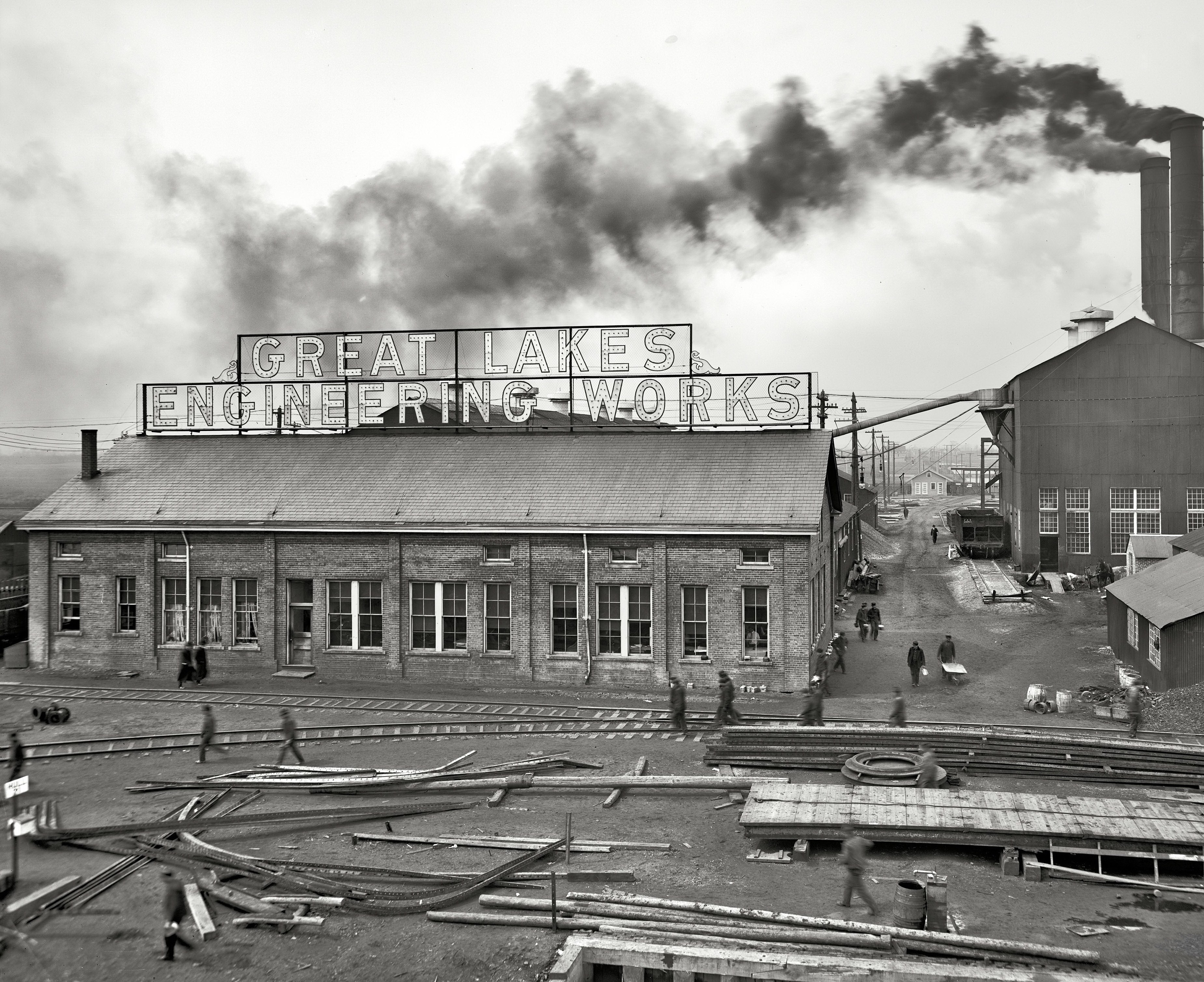
Great Lakes Engineering Works, circa 1906

The Great Lakes Engineering Works (GLEW) was a leading shipbuilding company with a shipyard in Ecorse, Michigan, that operated between 1902 and 1960. Within three years of its formation, it was building 50% of the tonnage of all ships in the Great Lakes. During World War II, GLEW was commissioned by Pittsburgh Steamship Company and the U.S. Maritime Commission to build 21 ore freighters. Its innovations included the first self-unloader freighter, SS Wyandotte. GLEW is best known for its construction of the SS Edmund Fitzgerald.

== History ==
The GLEW was formed in 1902 to purchase Riverside Ironworks. Riverside was the short-lived successor to the venerable Samuel F. Hodge & Company, (Note: 42.331°N 83.0316°W) which was well known for quality steam engines and provided access to both marine and non-marine engine markets. Because of the Hodge Company, which was founded in 1863, and other companies like them, the Detroit River community had become a hot bed for steam engine development. Antonio C. Pessano was elected as president and general manager for his engineering background and charismatic personality. The company realized that its Riverside yard had limited room and service docks. GLEW announced the purchase of a second shipyard in Ecorse, Michigan, in 1903 which later became the River Rouge yard, named after its location near the confluence of River Rouge into the Detroit River. The GLEW again expanded in 1905 when it acquired the Columbia Iron Works (Note: 42.8107°N 82.486°W) in St. Clair, and in 1912 when operations began at their Ashtabula shipyard (Note: 41.889°N 80.799°W) in Ohio.

It was anticipated that GLEW would be the largest shipbuilding plant on the Great Lakes. In 1903, the plant owned 85 acres (34 ha) along the Detroit River that included 1,400 feet (430 m) of river frontage. The company began with a capital of $1.5 million and a $500,000 bond issue. Within three years of GLEW's formation, Detroit built 50% of the tonnage of all ships in the Great Lakes.

The GLEW created opportunity for other companies and played a large wartime role during the company’s 58-year span. Many shipping companies hoped that the skilled craftsmanship of the GLEW would help establish their firm as a major contender within the Great Lakes shipping industry. The Northwestern Mutual Insurance Company of Milwaukee contracted the GLEW to build the first ‘super freighter’ thus putting them on the map. Other orders of the same magnitude ensued which benefited the local economy. Hugh McElroy, general superintendent of the GLEW, stated that these contracts presented 1,300 new jobs and thereby tripled the company’s workforce. William Penn Snyder, president of Shenango Furnace Company of Sharpsville, Pennsylvania, felt that the incorporation of GLEW ships would clearly change his smaller iron and steel industry into a leading competitor. Just as Snyder had hoped, the record-breaking freighter, SS Shenango, helped dramatically expand the company. This relationship between the two companies led to the contract of more ships whereby even Elizabeth Russel, daughter of John Russel, vice president and treasurer of GLEW had the honor of christening the SS William P. Snyder.

== Construction achievements ==
The GLEW set records and earned long-time standing recognition as a leading innovator in shipbuilding technology. In 1908, the SS Wyandotte was launched from the Ecorse site. This 364 ft (111 m) steel hulled, self-unloader was the prototype for the modern day self-unloader. Again technology advanced, and the ships of 1911 based their design on the Wyandotte but were incorporated with more features. The GLEW designed and built seven ships of “full canal dimensions and rather deep draft,” thereby forging the way for bigger and better products and production and pushed technology further.

In 1925 GLEW built the 604 ft (184 m) SS William C. Atwater at the River Rouge site at the request of Wilson Transit. The Atwater was “the first ship with full-size hatches [that] have single-piece steel hatch covers” As machinery advanced, so did the size of the vessels. By 1957, plans were made to build the largest ore carrier to maneuver the Lakes. GLEW'S hull #301 was named SS Edmund Fitzgerald. Her 729 ft (222 m) length made her the largest ship on the Great Lakes, and she had a carrying capacity of nearly 26,800 long tons (30,000 short tons; 27,200 t) of taconite. The "Queen of the Lakes" was launched on June 7, 1958, from GLEW’s River Rouge shipyard. Mrs. Edmund Fitzgerald had the privilege of breaking the champagne bottle on Fitzgerald ’s bow. The event received wide spread media coverage. An estimated 15,000 people showed up to witness the event that marked the first "maximum seaway-size" freighter on the Lakes. In 1975 the Fitzgerald arguably became the most famous shipwreck in the history of Great Lakes shipping, made legendary by Gordon Lightfoot's popular 1976 ballad, "The Wreck of the Edmund Fitzgerald".

== World Wars ==
The war years not only saw the construction but also the destruction of vessels. During World War I, the SS Vacuum (Hull # 99, Ecorse yard) commissioned by Ocean Freight Cargo Ship in 1912 as the SS Bayamon was sunk by German torpedo April 28, 1917, near Scotland. The SS Gratangen (Hull #156, Ashtabula) commissioned by Corona Coa in 1916 as the SS Corona was sunk by German submarine in 1917. The P. L. M. No. 4 (Hull #162, Ecorse) commissioned by the French government for the Paris, Lyon and Mediterranean Railway in 1916 was torpedoed and sunk in English Channel on December 27, 1917. However, the construction during wartime enabled the GLEW to bring economic prosperity to the Detroit area.

The Navy department appropriations bill for 1941 awarded Great Lakes shipyards government contracts worth almost 90 million dollars. The GLEW was responsible for 21 ore carriers commissioned by the Pittsburgh Steamship Company and the U.S. Maritime Commission. As the year came to an end, more military orders from Washington came in when the Great Lakes shipyards were already operating at full capacity. The shipbuilders met the increased demand by expanding and creating ways to heighten production levels that resulted in the larger, deeper vessels. Some of the vessels became casualties of war. The SS Catherine (hull # 219 from GLEW Ecorse) was commissioned by U.S. Maritime Commission as the SS Covedale in May 1919. She was torpedoed by Germans on June 17, 1941.

The supply and demands were met, but when peace came, the over-abundance of shipbuilding orders decreased and so too did the local economies of the once booming, small Great Lakes ports. The role of delivering bulk commodities could not change for GLEW’s vessels, and therefore they were valued whether at war or at peace. It was the decrease in shipbuilding orders that troubled the local economy and marked the end of an era.

== Decline ==
GLEW’s 58-year history saw the end to their own epoch. Foreign firms started producing ships for lower prices. Therefore, the American steamship companies began dealing abroad. On April 30, 1961, GLEW stockholders agreed to dissolve the shipbuilding giant and sell it to the Great Lakes Steel Corporation.

== Ships built ==
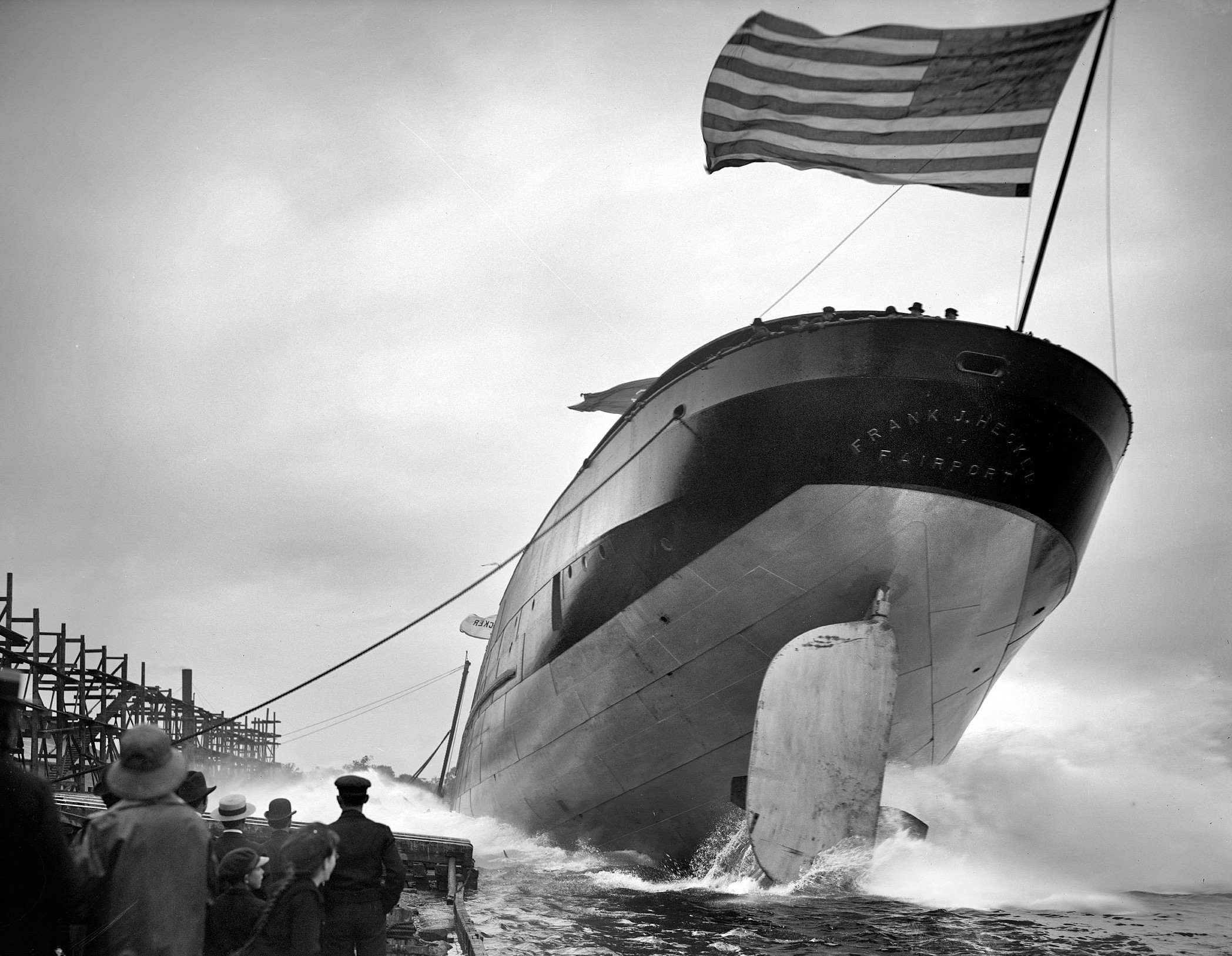
Frank J. Hecker, later Perseus, built by GLEW in St. Clair in 1905

- Examples:
- Category:Ships built in Ecorse, Michigan
- SS William G. Mather (1905), Scrapped in 1996.
- SS Col. James M. Schoonmaker (1911), Currently a museum ship in Toledo, Ohio.
- MV Benson Ford (1924), Scrapped in 1986, forward cabins and pilothouse now converted into a private residence on South Bass Island, Ohio.
- SS William G. Mather (1925), Currently a museum ship in Cleveland, Ohio.
- SS Alpena (1942), The oldest steamship currently operating on the Great Lakes.
- MV Mississagi (1943), Currently undergoing scrapping.
- SS William Clay Ford (1952,) Scrapped in 1987, pilothouse on display at Belle Isle, Michigan.
- SS Edmund Fitzgerald (1958), Sunk during a storm in 1975.
- SS Arthur B. Homer (1959), Sister ship to the SS Edmund Fitzgerald, scrapped in 1987.
- MV Herbert C. Jackson (1959), Constructed at the same time as the SS Edmund Fitzgerald and SS Arthur B. Homer, currently operating on the Great Lakes.
- SS Frank J. Hecker, later Perseus, built in St. Clair in 1905.
- SS Frank C. Ball (1905)
- SS B.F. Jones (1905)
- SS John Mitchell (1906)
- SS J.H. Sheadle (1906)
- SS William B. Davock (1907)
- SS Thomas F. Cole (1907)
- SS Willis L. King (1911)
- SS South American (1913)
- SS North American (1913)
- SS Delphine (1921)
- SS Cedarville (1927)
- James L. Kuber (1952)
- Vacationland a State of Michigan Ferry (1952)
  - For World War II, in 1943 built L6-S-B1 Lakers:
- Pilot Knob/Frank Armstrong
- Clarence B. Randall
- J. H. Hillman, Jr.
- Pilot Knob/Steelton
- Adirondack/Richard J. Reiss
- Lake Angelina/Cadillac
- Hill Annex/George A. Sloan
- McIntyre/Frank Purnell
- Robert C. Stanley
- Mesabi/Lehigh
