= James L. Kuber (lake freighter) =

Self-unloading articulated barge

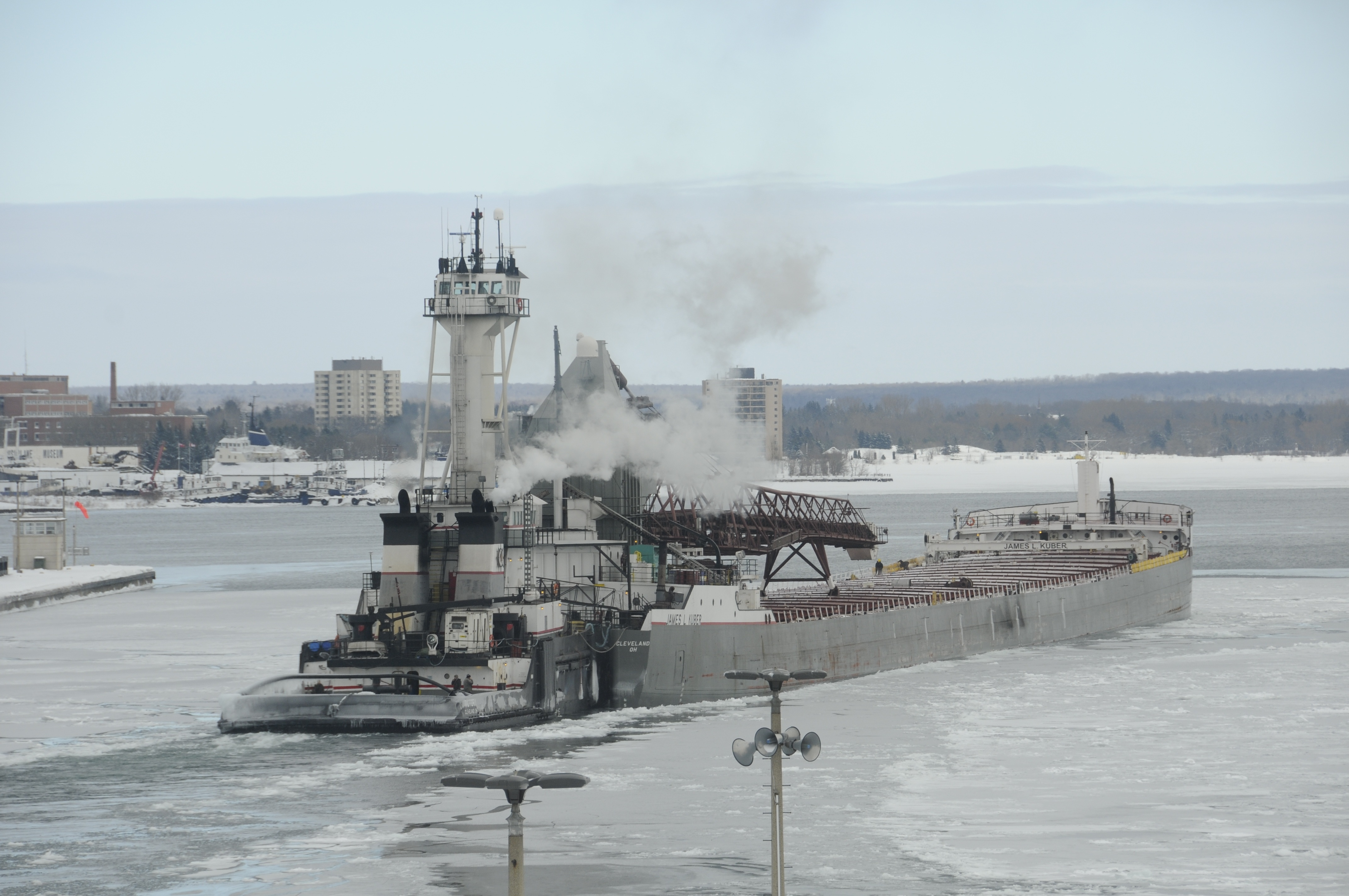
- James L. Kuber.

History

United States
- Owner: Oglebay Norton (1953–2006); Reserve Holdings LLC (2006–2011); Rand Logistics (2011–present)
- Operator: Grand River Navigation
- Builder: Great Lakes Engineering Works
- Laid down: as Reserve
- Launched: November 15, 1952
- Christened: March 29, 2008 (as James L. Kuber)
- Completed: 1953
- Maiden voyage: April 22, 1953
- Identification: IMO Number 5293341; MMSI Number 367480260; Call sign WDF7020

General characteristics
- Type: Self-unloading articulated barge
- Tonnage: 14,763 GT
- Length: 703 ft 8 in (214.48 m)
- Beam: 70 ft (21 m)
- Depth: 36 ft (11 m)
- Speed: 19 mph (17 kn)
- Capacity: 25,500 tons

James L. Kuber is a self-unloading articulated barge owned by Rand Logistics and operated by Grand River Navigation. The vessel was originally named Reserve and was constructed as a bulk carrier, being launched in 1952. It was converted to a barge in 2007.

== Construction ==
The ship was launched on November 15, 1952 for the Columbia Transportation Company's division of Oglebay Norton Company. It was built in 1953 as Reserve at Great Lakes Engineering Works in River Rouge, Michigan. It was one of eight loosely similar carriers classified as AAA-class ships. The AAA-class carriers were constructed due to a post-World War II need for iron ore. It was powered by a Westinghouse Electric Corp cross-compound steam turbine engine and two Foster-Wheeler water tube boilers. It had a speed of around 19 miles per hour (31 km/h).

Reserve's dimensions as built were 647 feet (197 m) long with a depth of hull of 36 feet (11 m). It had a capacity of around 21,000 tons. It was built with four holds and nineteen on-deck hatches.

== Service history ==
Reserve's maiden voyage took place on April 22, 1953. For the next 21 years, her service was relatively ordinary as she hauled iron ore across the Great Lakes.

=== Lengthening and first conversion ===
During her winter layup of 1974 to 1975, Reserve was lengthened by 120 feet (37 m) at Fraser Shipyards in Superior, Wisconsin. The upgrade cost US$5 million and increased Reserve's length to 767 feet (234 m). Due to the lengthening, her cargo capacity increased to 26,900 tons. The lengthening also added an additional hold and six more hatches to Reserve. In May 1982, Oglebay Norton made the decision to convert Reserve to a self-unloading vessel. The conversion took place at Bay Shipbuilding in Sturgeon Bay, Wisconsin. She could now unload at a rate of 5,357 tons per hour, although the conversions reduced her capacity to about 25,500 tons. Reserve returned to service in September 1983.

=== Service as a self-unloader ===
In April 1990, during heavy snow, the Reserve ran aground in the St. Marys River while carrying a cargo of ore from Duluth, Minnesota to Toledo. Repairs took place at Fraser Shipyards in Superior, Wisconsin. Later, in 1992, she ran aground in the St. Clair River after loss of steerage.

In March 2006, Oglebay Norton announced the sale of Reserve to Reserve Holdings LLC for US$4 million. Reserve sailed for the first time under her new owners on April 24, 2006. It was operated by Central Marine Logistics, based in Griffith, Indiana.

On April 2, 2007, a bearing overheated on Reserve. Turbine repairs commenced at Fraser Shipyards, and Reserve returned to service on May 20. After repairs took place, Oglebay Norton chose to convert Reserve to an articulated self-unloader similar to her fleetmate Lewis L. Kuber. After another two months, Reserve arrived at the KK Integrated Logistics dock in Menominee, Michigan for conversion to a self-unloading articulated barge. Most of the conversions took place in Menominee, but in December the barge was briefly moved to Bay Shipbuilding for drydock. It was returned to Menominee one month later. On March 29, 2008, the new articulated barge was christened James L. Kuber, after the brother of the owner of KK Integrated Shipping.

==== Service as James L. Kuber ====
James L. Kuber sails alongside the articulated barge Victory and frequently hauls stone from quarries along Lake Huron to destinations along the other Great Lakes. It also hauls iron from Superior, Wisconsin to Burns Harbor and Cleveland. In 2011, Rand Logistics acquired both Lewis J. Kuber and James L. Kuber from KK Integrated Shipping for US$35,500,000 and more than 1 million shares of stock.
