= SS B. F. Jones =

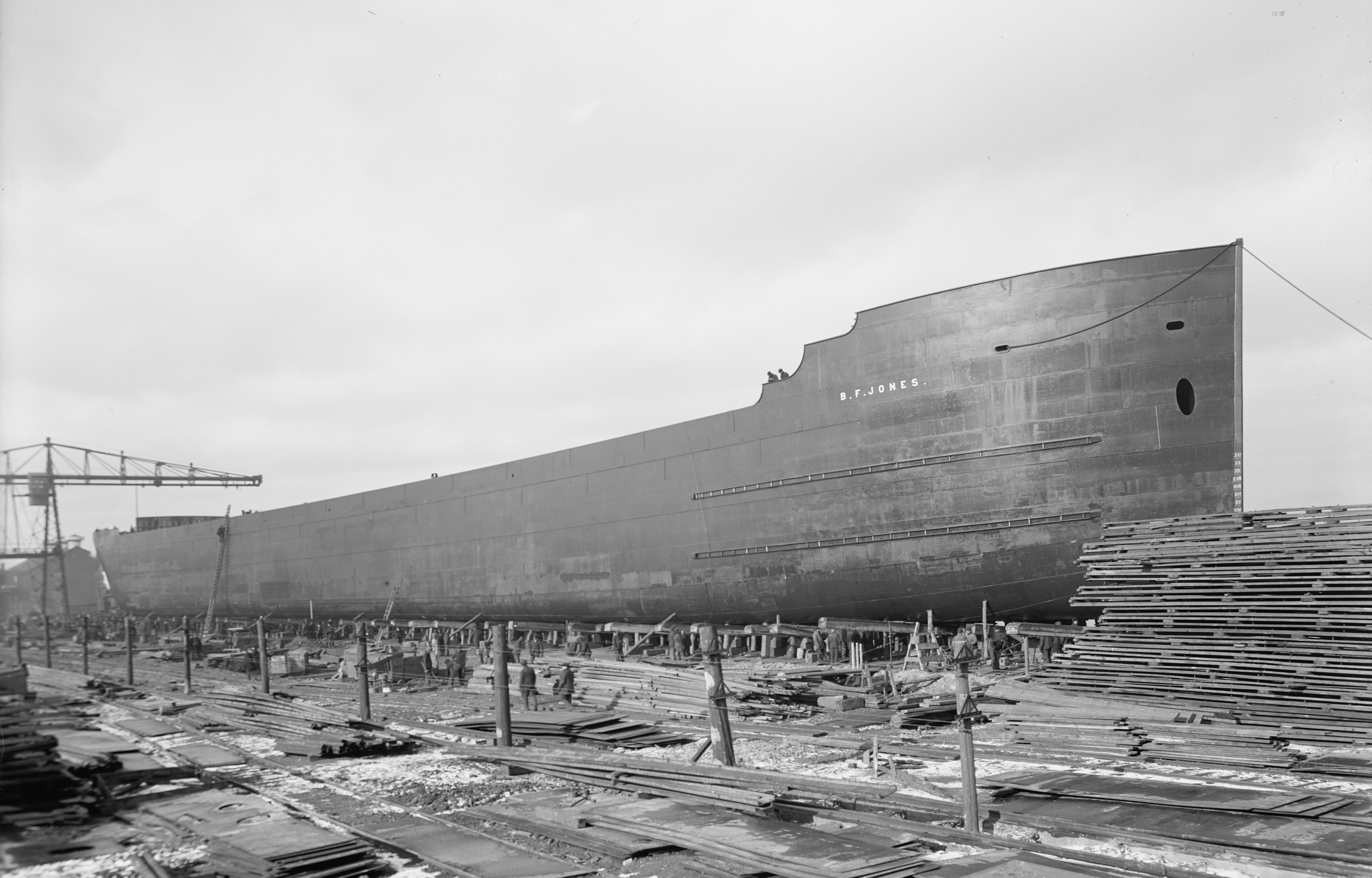
- The steamer B.F. Jones on the ways in Ecorse, Michigan

History

United States
- Name: B.F. Jones
- Operator: Interstate Steamship Company (a subsidiary of Jones and Laughlin Steel Company) 1906–1949; Jones and Laughlin Steel Company 1949–1952; Wilson Transit Company 1952–1955
- Port of registry: United States, Duluth, Minnesota
- Builder: Great Lakes Engineering Works, Ecorse, Michigan
- Yard number: 15
- Laid down: October 20, 1905
- Launched: December 30, 1905
- In service: April 20, 1906
- Out of service: August 21, 1955
- Identification: U.S. #202839
- Fate: Scrapped in Duluth, Minnesota after a collision with the steamer Cason J. Callaway

General characteristics
- Class & type: Lake freighter
- Tonnage: 6,939 GRT; 5,492 NRT
- Length: 552 ft (168 m)
- Beam: 56 ft (17 m)
- Height: 31 ft (9.4 m)
- Installed power: 2x Scotch marine boilers
- Propulsion: 1,700 hp (1,300 kW) triple expansion steam engine
- Speed: 10 knots (19 km/h; 12 mph)

SS B.F. Jones was a steel-hulled Great Lakes freighter that was named after one of the founders of the Jones and Laughlin Steel Company. She was launched on December 30, 1905 as hull #15. She operated from April 1906 to August 21, 1955 when she collided with the steamer Cason J. Callaway. After inspection she was declared a constructive total loss, and scrapped in Duluth, Minnesota.

== History ==
B.F. Jones (U.S. Registry #202839) was a product of the Great Lakes Engineering Works of Ecorse, Michigan for the Interstate Steamship Company (a subsidiary of Jones and Laughlin Steel Company) of Cleveland, Ohio. She was 552 feet (168 m) in length, having a 56-foot (17 m) beam and 31-foot (9.4 m) height, with a gross register tonnage of 6,939 tons and a net register tonnage of 5,492 tons. She was powered by a 1,700 horsepower (1,300 kW) triple expansion steam engine and fueled by two coal-fired Scotch marine boilers. She entered service on April 20, 1906. B.H. Jones had a sister ship named James Laughlin.

On October 26, 1924 B.H. Jones rammed the steamer E.A.S. Clarke in heavy fog in the Detroit River near the Great Lakes Engineering Works. E.A.S. Clarke sank almost immediately. There were no deaths. In 1937 B.H. Jones had her cargo hatches rebuilt with a hatch cover crane and 24-foot (7.3 m) centers in Detroit, Michigan, she was also extended to 560 feet (170 m) in length.

On October 23, 1941 B. H. Jones grounded off the east end of Belle Isle in the Detroit River. The tugboats America and Oregon arrived to assist her soon after the grounding. America got caught in the towline of Oregon, capsized and sank in five second into 19 feet (5.8 m) of water. Six of America's crew members died. In 1949 the Interstate Steamship Company's fleet merged with their parent company, the Jones and Laughlin Steel Company of Pittsburgh, Pennsylvania.

Her career with Jones and Laughlin lasted only three years. On November 15, 1952 Jones and Laughlin's fleet was sold to the Wilson Transit Company of Cleveland, Ohio (she was re-registered to Wilmington, Delaware).

On August 21, 1955 B.H. Jones was seriously damaged in a collision with the larger steamer Cason J. Callaway, they collided because of heavy fog near Lime Island in the St. Mary's River. After an inspection she was declared a constructive total loss. She was sold for scrap to the Duluth Iron & Metal Company and scrapped in Duluth, Minnesota. B.H. Jones's pilot house, one-piece steel hatch covers and deck crane were transferred to the steamer Sparkman D. Foster.

== See also ==
- SS William C. Moreland
- American Ship Building Company
- Benjamin Franklin Jones (industrialist)
- James H. Laughlin
