= Calumet and Arizona Mining Company =

Former US mining company

The Calumet and Arizona Mining Company (C & A) was a major mining company in Arizona during the late 1800s and early 1900s. In addition to mining, they developed the Warren townsite, based on the "City Beautiful" concept. The company existed until 1931, when it merged with the Phelps-Dodge Company.

== History ==
In September 1899, a mining development company, the Lake Superior and Western Development Company, was formed by Charles Briggs and several other investors, to pursue the possibilities of mining in Arizona. In 1900, the company purchased certain patented mining claims from the Arizona pioneer, Martin Costello. Testing work was done, and a decision was made to move forward with mining operations. To raise money for the endeavor, a public company known as the Calumet and Arizona Mining Company was decided to form.

The company was officially organized in March 1901 in Arizona. Its original holdings consisted of 10 patented mining claims totaling 178 acres adjacent to the Copper Queen Mine near Bisbee, Arizona. In 1902, it opened one of the largest copper smelting plants in Arizona, outside of Douglas. Four nearby mining companies, the Pittsburgh and Duluth Mining Company, the Calumet and Pittsburgh Mining Company, the Junction Mining Company, and the Calce Superior and Pittsburgh Mining Company, consolidated in 1906 to form the Superior and Pittsburgh Mining Company. This company, in turn, was absorbed by the Calument and Arizona Mining Company in 1911, increasing the company's holdings to 120 claims covering 1,528 acres. Later in the 1910s, the company grew to 168 claims on 2056 acres, with the acquisition of the American-Saginaw Mining Company. In 1914, the original smelting plant was replaced with a newer, more modern plant, doubling plant production. In addition, the efficiency of the plant also increased the percentage of gold and silver being produced.

The first president of the corporation was Charles Briggs, and its original board of directors consisted of Briggs, James Hoatson, James Milligan, John S. Dymock, Ernest Bollman, Chester A. Congdon, Thomas F. Cole, C. d'Autremont Jr., and George E. Tener. The first five all lived in Calumet, Michigan, while Congdon, Cole, and d'Autremont all lived in Duluth, Minnesota, and Tener was from Pittsburgh, Pennsylvania. These same board members also made up the entire boards of the four companies which would merge into the Superior and Pittsburgh Mining Company. Briggs would remain president until his resignation in 1921.

As part of their growth, they developed the Warren townsite, based on the "City Beautiful" concept, on the outskirts of Bisbee, Arizona. The Warren Realty and Development Company was organized in May 1905 to develop the site, in response to the overcrowding in Bisbee, and was named after George Warren. The town was laid out in a wedge-shape in order to exploit the area's natural drainage. The site was opened to the public in January 1907, and by 1908 included a ballpark and a public golf course, the latter being one of the first in Arizona.

In 1931, the company merged with the Phelps-Dodge corporation. In exchange for cash and stock, all shares of the company were exchanged for 3.25 shares of Phelps-Dodge stock per share. At the time, C & A had assets including the 85 Mine at Valedon, New Mexico, a smelter in Douglas, Arizona, a portion of the joint venture, Verde Central Mines, and the Cornelia Mine near Ajo, Arizona.
