= United States Congressional Joint Committee on Taxation =

Committee of the U.S. Congress

The Joint Committee on Taxation (JCT) is a Committee of the U.S. Congress established under the Internal Revenue Code at 26 U.S.C. § 8001.

== Structure ==
The Joint Committee is composed of ten Members: five from the Senate Finance Committee and five from the House Ways and Means Committee.

The Committee is chaired on a rotating basis by the Chair of the Senate Finance Committee and the Chair of the House Ways and Means Committee. During the first Session of each Congress the House has the joint committee chair and the Senate has the vice chair; during the second session the roles are reversed.

The Members of the Joint Committee choose the Chief of Staff of the Joint Committee, who is responsible for selecting the remainder of the staff on a nonpartisan basis. Since May 15, 2009, the Chief of Staff of the Joint Committee has been Thomas A. Barthold.

== Duties ==
The duties of the Joint Committee are:

1. Investigate the operation, effects, and administration of internal revenue taxes
2. Investigate measures and methods for the simplification of taxes
3. Make reports on the results of those investigations and studies and make recommendations
4. Review any proposed refund or credit of taxes in excess of $2 million

With respect to the estimation of revenues for Congress, the Joint Committee serves a purpose parallel to that of the Congressional Budget Office for the estimation of spending for Congress, the Department of the Treasury for the estimation of revenues for the executive branch, and the Office of Management and Budget for the estimation of spending for the executive branch.

== History ==
In 1924, Senator James Couzens (Michigan) introduced a resolution in the Senate for the creation of a Select Committee to investigate the Bureau of Internal Revenue. At the time, there were reports of inefficiency and waste in the Bureau and allegations that the method of making refunds created the opportunity for fraud. One of the issues investigated by the Select Committee was the valuation of oil properties. The Committee found that there appeared to be no system, no adherence to principle, and a total absence of competent supervision in the determination of oil property values.

In 1925, after making public charges that millions of tax dollars were being lost through the favorable treatment of large corporations by the Bureau, Couzens was notified by the Bureau that he owed more than $10 million in back taxes. Then Treasury Secretary Andrew Mellon was believed to be personally responsible for the retaliation against Couzens. At the time, Mellon was the principal owner of Gulf Oil, which had benefited from rulings specifically criticized by Couzens.

The investigations by the Senate Select Committee led, in the Revenue Act of 1926, to the creation of the Joint Committee on Internal Revenue Taxation. The select committee emphasized

the need for the institution of a procedure by which the Congress could be better advised as to the systems and methods employed in the administration of the internal revenue laws with a view to the needs for legislation in the future, simplification and clarification of administration, and generally a closer understanding of the detailed problems with which both the taxpayer and the Bureau of Internal Revenue are confronted. It is more properly the function of the Senate Finance Committee and the House Ways and Means Committee, jointly, to engage in such an activity.(2)

As originally conceived by the House, a temporary "Joint Commission on Taxation" was to be created to "investigate and report upon the operation, effects, and administration of the Federal system of income and other internal revenue taxes and upon any proposals or measures which in the judgment of the Commission may be employed to simplify or improve the operation or administration of such systems of taxes.....".(1)

The Senate expanded significantly the functions contemplated by the House and transformed the proposed Joint Commission to a Joint Committee with a permanent staff. The Senate version was incorporated into the Revenue Act of 1926 and the Joint Committee was created.(3)

The first Chief of Staff of the Joint Committee on Internal Revenue Taxation was L.H. Parker, who had been the chief investigator on Senator Couzens' Select Senate Committee. The Revenue Act of 1926 required the Joint Committee on Internal Revenue Taxation to publish from time to time for public examination and analysis proposed measures and methods for the simplification of internal revenue taxes and required the Joint Committee to provide a written report to the House and Senate by December 31, 1927, with such recommendations as it deemed advisable. The Joint Committee published its initial report on November 15, 1927, and made various recommendations to simplify the federal tax system, including a recommendation for the restructuring of the federal income tax title.

In the Revenue Act of 1928, the Joint Committee's authority was extended to the review of all refunds or credits of any income, war-profits, excess-profits, or estate or gift tax in excess of $75,000. In addition, the Act required the Joint Committee to make an annual report to the Congress with respect to such refunds and credits, including the names of all persons and corporations to whom amounts are credited or payments are made, together with the amounts credit or paid to each.

Since 1928, the threshold for review of large tax refunds has been increased from $75,000 to $2 million in various steps and the taxes to which such review applies has been expanded. Other than that, the Joint Committee's responsibilities under the Internal Revenue Code have remained essentially unchanged since 1928.

While the statutory mandate of the Joint Committee has not changed significantly, the tax legislative process, however, has.

There are five members of each house on the committee, which has no subcommittees. The committee leadership (chair/vice chair and ranking member/vice ranking member) between the House and Senate at the start of each session of the congressional term (once per year). The tables below use the leadership titles from the start of each Congress' first session.

== Chairs ==
A list of former chairs is listed below.

Name	Party	State	Start	End	Chamber
William Green	Republican	IA	1924	1928	House
Willis Hawley	Republican	OR	1928	1932	House
James Collier	Democratic	MS	1932	1933	House
Pat Harrison	Democratic	MS	1933	1935	Senate
Robert Doughton	Democratic	NC	1935	1936	House
Pat Harrison	Democratic	MS	1936	1937	Senate
Robert Doughton	Democratic	NC	1937	1938	House
Pat Harrison	Democratic	MS	1938	1939	Senate
Robert Doughton	Democratic	NC	1939	1940	House
Pat Harrison	Democratic	MS	1940	1941	Senate
Robert Doughton	Democratic	NC	1941	1942	House
Pat Harrison	Democratic	MS	1942	1943	Senate
Robert Doughton	Democratic	NC	1943	1944	House
Walter George	Democratic	GA	1944	1945	Senate
Robert Doughton	Democratic	NC	1945	1946	House
Walter George	Democratic	GA	1946	1947	Senate
Harold Knutson	Republican	MN	1947	1948	House
Eugene Millikin	Democratic	CO	1948	1949	Senate
Robert Doughton	Democratic	NC	1949	1950	House
Walter George	Democratic	GA	1950	1951	Senate
Robert Doughton	Democratic	NC	1951	1952	House
Walter George	Democratic	GA	1952	1953	Senate
Daniel Reed	Republican	NY	1953	1954	House
Eugene Millikin	Democratic	CO	1954	1955	Senate
Jere Cooper	Democratic	TN	1955	1956	House
Harry Byrd	Democratic	VA	1956	1957	Senate
Jere Cooper	Democratic	TN	1957	1958	House
Harry Byrd	Democratic	VA	1958	1959	Senate
Wilbur Mills	Democratic	AR	1959	1960	House
Harry Byrd	Democratic	VA	1960	1961	Senate
Wilbur Mills	Democratic	AR	1961	1962	House
Harry Byrd	Democratic	VA	1962	1963	Senate
Wilbur Mills	Democratic	AR	1963	1964	House
Harry Byrd	Democratic	VA	1964	1965	Senate
Wilbur Mills	Democratic	AR	1965	1966	House
Russell Long	Democratic	LA	1966	1967	Senate
Wilbur Mills	Democratic	AR	1967	1968	House
Russell Long	Democratic	LA	1968	1969	Senate
Wilbur Mills	Democratic	AR	1969	1970	House
Russell Long	Democratic	LA	1970	1971	Senate
Wilbur Mills	Democratic	AR	1971	1972	House
Russell Long	Democratic	LA	1972	1973	Senate
Wilbur Mills	Democratic	AR	1973	1974	House
Russell Long	Democratic	LA	1974	1975	Senate
Al Ullman	Democratic	OR	1975	1976	House
Russell Long	Democratic	LA	1976	1977	Senate
Al Ullman	Democratic	OR	1977	1978	House
Russell Long	Democratic	LA	1978	1979	Senate
Al Ullman	Democratic	OR	1979	1980	House
Russell Long	Democratic	LA	1980	1981	Senate
Dan Rostenkowski	Democratic	IL	1981	1982	House
Bob Dole	Republican	KS	1982	1983	Senate
Dan Rostenkowski	Democratic	IL	1983	1984	House
Bob Dole	Republican	KS	1984	1985	Senate
Dan Rostenkowski	Democratic	IL	1985	1986	House
Bob Packwood	Republican	OR	1986	1987	Senate
Dan Rostenkowski	Democratic	IL	1987	1988	House
Lloyd Bentsen	Democratic	TX	1988	1989	Senate
Dan Rostenkowski	Democratic	IL	1989	1990	House
Lloyd Bentsen	Democratic	TX	1990	1991	Senate
Dan Rostenkowski	Democratic	IL	1991	1992	House
Lloyd Bentsen	Democratic	TX	1992	1993	Senate
Dan Rostenkowski	Democratic	IL	1993	1994	House
Pat Moynihan	Democratic	NY	1994	1995	Senate
Bill Archer	Republican	TX	1995	1996	House
Bob Packwood	Republican	OR	1996	1997	Senate
Bill Archer	Republican	TX	1997	1998	House
Bill Roth	Republican	DE	1998	1999	Senate
Bill Archer	Republican	TX	1999	2000	House
Bill Roth	Republican	DE	2000	2001	Senate
Bill Thomas	Republican	CA	2001	2002	House
Max Baucus	Democratic	MT	2002	2003	Senate
Bill Thomas	Republican	CA	2003	2004	House
Chuck Grassley	Republican	IA	2004	2005	Senate
Bill Thomas	Republican	CA	2005	2006	House
Chuck Grassley	Republican	IA	2006	2007	Senate
Charlie Rangel	Democratic	NY	2007	2008	House
Max Baucus	Democratic	MT	2008	2009	Senate
Charlie Rangel	Democratic	NY	2009	2010	House
Max Baucus	Democratic	MT	2010	2011	Senate
Dave Camp	Republican	MI	2011	2012	House
Max Baucus	Democratic	MT	2012	2013	Senate
Dave Camp	Republican	MI	2013	2014	House
Ron Wyden	Democratic	OR	2014	2015	Senate
Paul Ryan	Republican	WI	2015		House
Sam Johnson; Texas	Republican	TX	2015		House
Kevin Brady	Republican	TX	2015	2016	House
Orrin Hatch	Republican	UT	2016	2017	Senate
Kevin Brady	Republican	TX	2017	2018	House
Orrin Hatch	Republican	UT	2018	2019	Senate
Richard Neal	Democratic	MA	2019	2020	House
Chuck Grassley	Republican	IA	2020	2021	Senate
Richard Neal	Democratic	MA	2021	2022	House
Chuck Grassley	Republican	IA	2022	2023	Senate
Jason Smith	Republican	MO	2023	2024	House
Ron Wyden	Democratic	OR	2024	2025	Senate
Jason Smith	Republican	MO	2025	2026	House
Mike Crapo	Republican	ID	2026	present	Senate

== Members, 118th Congress ==
	Majority	Minority
Senate members	Ron Wyden, Oregon, Vice Chair; Debbie Stabenow, Michigan; Maria Cantwell, Washington	Mike Crapo, Idaho; Chuck Grassley, Iowa
House members	Jason Smith, Missouri, Chair; Kevin Brady, Texas; Vern Buchanan, Florida	Richard Neal, Massachusetts; Lloyd Doggett, Texas

== Members, 117th Congress ==
	Majority	Minority
Senate members	Ron Wyden, Oregon, Vice Chair; Debbie Stabenow, Michigan; Maria Cantwell, Washington	Mike Crapo, Idaho, Ranking Member; Chuck Grassley, Iowa
House members	Richard Neal, Massachusetts, Chair; Lloyd Doggett, Texas; Mike Thompson, California	Kevin Brady, Texas, Vice Ranking Member; Vern Buchanan, Florida

== Members, 116th Congress ==
	Majority	Minority
Senate members	Chuck Grassley, Iowa, Vice Chair; Mike Crapo, Idaho; Mike Enzi, Wyoming	Ron Wyden, Oregon, Ranking Member; Debbie Stabenow, Michigan
House members	Richard Neal, Massachusetts, Chair; John Lewis, Georgia (Until July 17, 2020); Lloyd Doggett, Texas	Kevin Brady, Texas, Vice Ranking Member; Devin Nunes, California

== Members, 115th Congress ==
	Majority	Minority
Senate members	Orrin Hatch, Utah, Chair; Chuck Grassley, Iowa; Mike Crapo, Idaho	Ron Wyden, Oregon, Vice Ranking Member; Debbie Stabenow, Michigan
House members	Kevin Brady, Texas, Vice Chair; Sam Johnson, Texas; Devin Nunes, California	Richard Neal, Massachusetts, Ranking Member; John Lewis, Georgia

== Members, 114th Congress ==
	Majority	Minority
Senate members	Orrin Hatch, Utah, Vice Chair; Chuck Grassley, Iowa; Mike Crapo, Idaho	Ron Wyden, Oregon, Ranking Member; Debbie Stabenow, Michigan
House members	Kevin Brady, Texas, Chair; Sam Johnson, Texas; Devin Nunes, California	Sandy Levin, Michigan, Vice Ranking Member; Charlie Rangel, New York
