= Henry Blake Hays =

American coal industry pioneer (1829–1881)

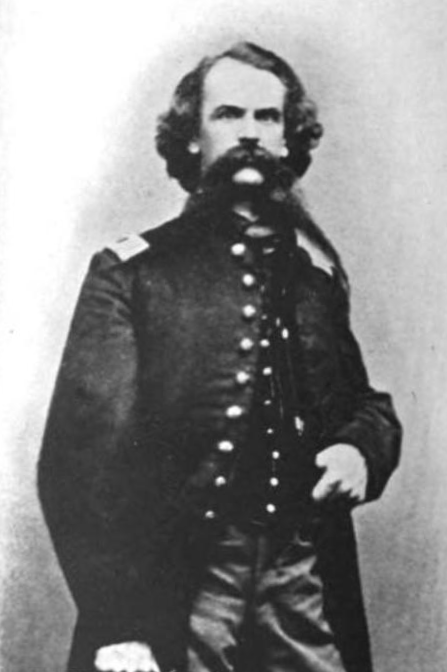
- Born: August 12, 1829; Allegheny County, Pennsylvania, U.S.
- Died: August 10, 1881 (aged 51) Hays Station, Allegheny County, Pennsylvania
- Resting place: Allegheny Cemetery, Pittsburgh, Pennsylvania
- Occupations: Cavalry captain, railroad operator
- Years active: Diplomat: 1850-1857; Military: 1861-1864; Railroads: 1857-1881
- Spouse: Mary Howard (m. 1869)
- Children: 2
- Parent: James Harden Hays (father)
- Military career
- Allegiance: United States; Union
- Rank: Cavalry captain

Henry Blake Hays (1829–1881) was a leader of the coal industry in Allegheny County, Pennsylvania.

== Early life ==
He was born August 12, 1829, in Allegheny County, Pennsylvania, the son of James H. Hays and Mary Cready.

== Military career ==
He served as a captain in the 6th U.S. Cavalry during the Civil War from 1861 to his resignation in 1864.

== Industrial career ==
As the son of James H. Hays, he helped run the family coal mines. He operated the H.B. Hays and Brothers Coal Railroad, a narrow gauge coal railroad with branches that ran along Becks Run and Streets Run. He was a director of the Pittsburgh, Virginia and Charleston Railway.

He married Mary Howard in Pittsburgh on November 17, 1869, and they had two children.

He died at his home in Allegheny County on August 10, 1881.
