= Andrew Mellon =

American businessman and politician (1855-1937)

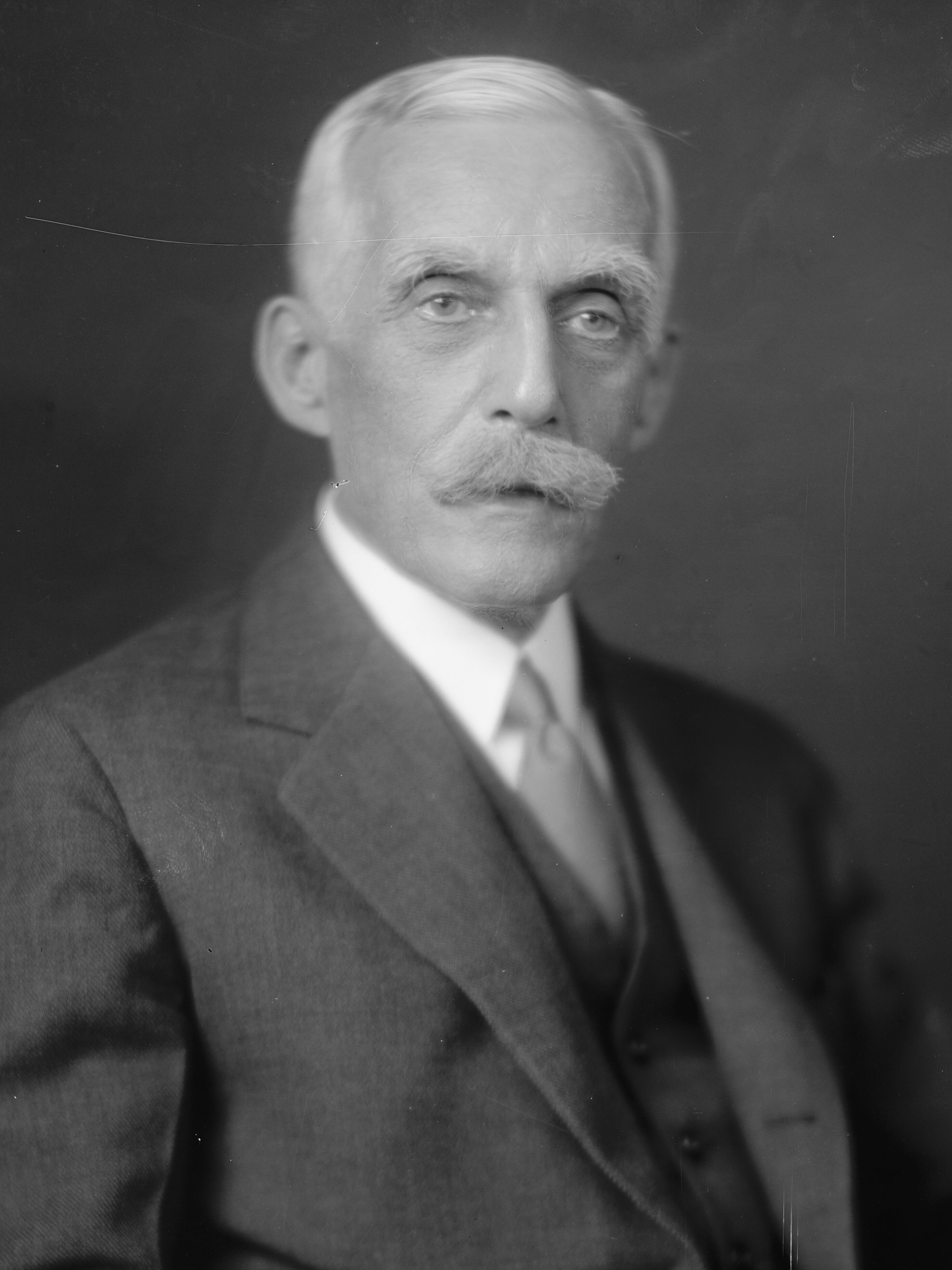
- Mellon c. 1920s

42nd United States Ambassador to the United Kingdom
- In office April 9, 1932 – March 17, 1933
- President: Herbert Hoover; Franklin D. Roosevelt
- Preceded by: Charles G. Dawes
- Succeeded by: Robert Worth Bingham

49th United States Secretary of the Treasury
- In office March 9, 1921 – February 12, 1932
- President: Warren G. Harding; Calvin Coolidge; Herbert Hoover
- Preceded by: David F. Houston
- Succeeded by: Ogden L. Mills

Personal details
- Born: Andrew William Mellon; March 24, 1855 Pittsburgh, Pennsylvania, U.S.
- Died: August 26, 1937 (aged 82) Southampton, New York, U.S.
- Party: Republican
- Spouse: Nora McMullen (m. 1900; div. 1912)
- Children: Ailsa; Paul
- Relatives: Thomas Mellon (father); Richard B. Mellon (brother)
- Education: Western University of Pennsylvania (no degree)

Andrew William Mellon (/ˈmɛlən/; March 24, 1855 – August 26, 1937), known also as A. W. Mellon, was an American banker, businessman, industrialist, philanthropist, art collector, and politician. The son of Mellon family patriarch Thomas Mellon, he established a vast business empire before moving into politics. He served as United States Secretary of the Treasury from March 9, 1921, to February 12, 1932, presiding over the boom years of the 1920s and the Wall Street crash of 1929. A conservative Republican, Mellon favored policies that reduced taxation and the national debt of the United States in the aftermath of World War I. Mellon also helped fund and manage Kennywood Park in West Mifflin, Pennsylvania.

Andrew began working at his father's Pittsburgh, Pennsylvania, bank, T. Mellon & Sons, in the early 1870s, eventually becoming the leading figure in the institution. He later renamed T. Mellon & Sons as Mellon National Bank and established another financial institution, the Union Trust Company in Pittsburgh in 1889. By the end of 1913, Mellon National Bank held more money in deposits than any other bank in Pittsburgh, and the second-largest bank in the region was controlled by Union Trust. In the course of his business career, Mellon owned or helped finance large companies including Alcoa, the New York Shipbuilding Corporation, Old Overholt whiskey, Standard Steel Car Company, Westinghouse Electric Corporation, Koppers, the Pittsburgh Coal Company, the Carborundum Company, Union Steel Company, the McClintic-Marshall Construction Company, Gulf Oil, and numerous others. He was also an influential donor to the Republican Party during the Gilded Age and the Progressive Era.

In 1921, newly elected president Warren G. Harding chose Mellon as his secretary of the treasury. Mellon would remain in office until 1932, serving under Harding, Calvin Coolidge, and Herbert Hoover, all three of whom were members of the Republican Party. Mellon sought to reform federal taxation in the aftermath of World War I. He argued cutting tax rates on top earners would generate more tax revenue for the government, but otherwise left in place a progressive income tax. Some of Mellon's proposals were enacted by the Revenue Act of 1921 and the Revenue Act of 1924, but it was not until the passage of the Revenue Act of 1926 that the "Mellon plan" was fully realized. He also presided over a reduction in the national debt, which dropped substantially in the 1920s. Mellon's influence in state and national politics reached its zenith during Coolidge's presidency. Journalist William Allen White noted that "so completely did Andrew Mellon dominate the White House in the days when the Coolidge administration was at its zenith that it would be fair to call the administration the reign of Coolidge and Mellon."

Mellon's national reputation collapsed following the Wall Street crash of 1929 and the onset of the Great Depression. He participated in various efforts by the Hoover administration to revive the economy and maintain the international economic order, but opposed direct government intervention in the economy. After Congress began impeachment proceedings against Mellon, President Hoover shifted Mellon to the position of United States ambassador to the United Kingdom. Mellon returned to private life after Hoover's defeat in the 1932 presidential election by Franklin D. Roosevelt. Beginning in 1933, the federal government launched a tax fraud investigation on Mellon, leading to a high-profile case that ended with Mellon's estate paying significant sums to settle the matter. Shortly before his death, in 1937, Mellon helped establish the National Gallery of Art. His philanthropic efforts also played a major role in the later establishment of Carnegie Mellon University and the National Portrait Gallery.

== Early life ==
Mellon's paternal grandparents, both of whom were Ulster Scots, migrated to the United States from County Tyrone, Ireland, in 1818. With their son, Thomas Mellon, they settled in Westmoreland County, Pennsylvania. Thomas Mellon established a successful legal practice in Pittsburgh, and in 1843 he married Sarah Jane Negley, an heiress descended from some of the first settlers of Pittsburgh. Thomas became a wealthy landowner and real estate speculator, and he and his wife had eight children, five of whom survived to adulthood. Andrew Mellon, the fourth son and sixth child of Thomas and Sarah, was born in 1855. Thomas Mellon became a prominent member of the local Republican Party, and in 1859 he won election to a position on the Pennsylvania court of common pleas. Because Thomas was suspicious of both private and public schools, he built a schoolhouse for his children and hired a teacher; Andrew attended this school beginning at age five.

In 1869, after leaving his judicial position, Thomas Mellon established T. Mellon & Sons, a bank located in Pittsburgh. Andrew joined his father at the bank, quickly becoming a valued employee despite being in his early teens. Andrew also attended the Western University of Pennsylvania (which was later renamed the University of Pittsburgh), but he never graduated. After leaving Western University, Andrew briefly worked at a lumber and coal business before joining T. Mellon & Sons as a full-time employee in 1873. That same year, the Panic of 1873 devastated the local and national economy, wiping out a portion of the Mellon fortune. With Andrew taking a leading role at T. Mellon & Sons, the bank quickly recovered, and by late 1874 the bank's deposits had reached the level they had been at before the onset of the Panic.

== Business career, 1873–1920 ==
=== Business career, 1873–1898 ===
Mellon's role at T. Mellon & Sons continued to grow after 1873, and in 1876 he was given power of attorney to direct the operations of the bank. That same year, Thomas introduced his son to Henry Clay Frick, a customer of the bank who would become one of Mellons's closest friends. In 1882, Thomas turned over full ownership of the bank to his son, but Thomas continued to be involved in the bank's activities. Five years later, Mellon's younger brother, Richard B. Mellon, joined T. Mellon & Sons as a co-owner and vice president.

During the 1880s, Mellon began to expand the bank's activities. Along with Frick, Mellon gained control of the Pittsburgh National Bank of Commerce, a national bank that was authorized to print banknotes. Mellon also acquired or helped found the Union Insurance Company, City Deposit Bank, the Fidelity Title and Trust Company, and the Union Trust Company. He branched out into industrial concerns, becoming a director of the Pittsburgh Petroleum Exchange and a co-founder of two natural gas companies that collectively controlled 35,000 acres of gas lands in the late 1880s. In 1890, Thomas Mellon transferred his properties to Andrew, who would manage the properties on behalf of himself, his parents, and his brothers. In late 1894, Thomas transferred all of his remaining assets to Andrew. Despite the large sums entrusted to Andrew, the businesses he ran were still fairly small in the 1890s; T. Mellon & Sons employed seven individuals in 1895.

In 1889, Mellon agreed to loan $25,000 to the Pittsburgh Reduction Company, a fledgling operation seeking to become the first successful industrial producer of aluminum. Mellon became a director of the company in 1891, and he and Richard played a major role in the establishment of aluminum factories in New Kensington, Pennsylvania, and Niagara Falls, New York. The company would emerge as one of the most profitable ventures invested in by the Mellons, and in 1907 it was renamed Alcoa. Moving into the petroleum industry, the Mellon family also established the Crescent Oil Company, the Crescent Pipeline Company, and the Bear Creek refinery. By 1894, the Mellon family's vertically integrated companies produced ten percent of the oil exported by the United States. Partly due to the difficult economic conditions caused by the onset of the Panic of 1893, in 1895 the Mellons sold their oil interests to Standard Oil. At roughly the same time they were selling their oil concerns, Andrew and Richard invested in the Carborundum Company, a producer of silicon carbide. The brothers gained majority ownership of the Carborundum Company in 1898 and replaced the company's founder and president, Edward Goodrich Acheson, with a Carnegie protege, Frank W. Haskell. Mellon also invested in mining concerns, becoming vice president of the Trade Dollar Consolidated Mining Company.

Mellon and Henry Clay Frick enjoyed a long-lasting business and social relationship, and Frick frequently hosted Mellon, attorney Philander C. Knox, inventor George Westinghouse, and others for poker games. Frick and Mellon both joined the Duquesne Club and, after Frick established the South Fork Fishing and Hunting Club, Mellon became one of that club's first members. The South Fork Fishing and Hunting Club built the South Fork Dam, which supported an artificial lake that the club used for boating and fishing. In 1889, the dam broke, causing the Johnstown Flood, which killed 2,000 people and destroyed 1,600 homes. In the aftermath of the flood, Knox led a legal defense that successfully argued that the club bore no legal responsibility for the flood. Mellon did not publicly comment on the flood, though he did donate $1,000 to a relief fund.

=== Business career, 1898–1920 ===
By the late 1890s, Mellon had amassed a substantial fortune, but his wealth paled in comparison to that of better-known business leaders such as John D. Rockefeller. In the late 1890s, the Union Trust Company emerged for the first time as one of Mellon's most important and profitable holdings after Mellon broadened the company's activities to include commercial banking. With an infusion of capital from Union Trust, Mellon underwrote the capitalization of National Glass and several other companies. He also became a co-owner of the McClintic-Marshall Construction Company and established Crucible Steel Company, the Pittsburgh Coal Company, and the Monongahela River Coal Company; the two coal companies collectively contributed 11 percent of the coal production of the United States. With Frick, Richard Mellon, and William Donner, Mellon co-founded Union Steel Company, which specialized in the production of nails and barbed wire. Though Frick had fallen out with steel magnate and long-time business partner Andrew Carnegie, Mellon received Carnegie's consent to venture into the steel industry. Responding to the growing emphasis on naval power in the aftermath of the Spanish–American War, Mellon and Frick also became major shareholders in the New York Shipbuilding Corporation.

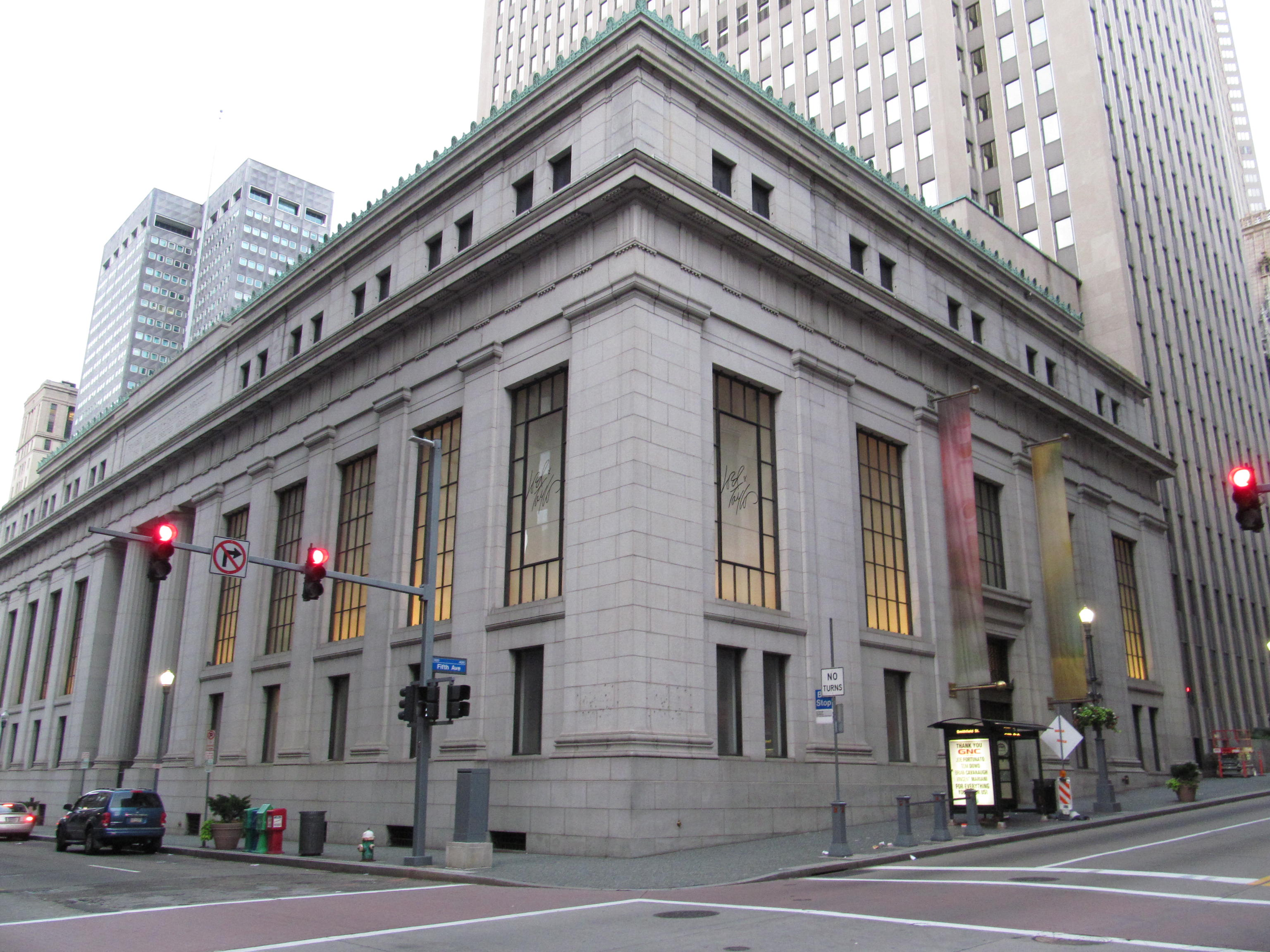
The Mellon National Bank Building, which served as the headquarters of Mellon National Bank after it was completed in 1924

In 1902, Mellon reorganized T. Mellon & Sons as the Mellon National Bank, a federally chartered National Bank. Andrew Mellon, Richard Mellon, and Frick drew up a new business arrangement in which the three of them jointly controlled the Union Trust Company, which in turn controlled Mellon National Bank. They also established Union Savings Bank, which accepted deposits by mail, and the Mellon banks flourished in the first years of the 20th century. While Mellon's financial empire prospered, his investments in other areas, including Pittsburgh's streetcar network, the Union Steel Company (which was bought out by U.S. Steel), and the Carborundum Company, also paid off handsomely. Another successful Mellon investment, the Standard Steel Car Company, was created in partnership with three former U.S. Steel executives. As part of the Texas oil boom, the Mellons also helped J. M. Guffey establish the Guffey Company. The Mellons later removed Guffey as the head of his company, and in 1907 they reorganized the Guffey Company as Gulf Oil and installed William Larimer Mellon Sr. (a son of Andrew Mellon's older brother, James Ross Mellon) as the head of Gulf Oil. The success of Mellon's financial empire and his varied investments made him, according to biographer David Cannadine, the "single most significant individual in the economic life and progress of western Pennsylvania" in the first decade of the 20th century.

The Panic of 1907 devastated several companies based in Pittsburgh, ending a period of strong growth. Some of Mellon's investments experienced a sustained down period after 1907, but most experienced a quick recovery. Mellon also became an investor in George Westinghouse's Westinghouse Electric Corporation after he helped prevent the company from going into bankruptcy. By the end of 1913, Mellon National Bank held more money in deposits than any other bank in Pittsburgh, and the Farmer's Deposit National Bank, which held the second-largest amount of deposits, was controlled by Mellon's Union Trust Company. In 1914, Mellon became a co-owner of Koppers, which produced a more sophisticated coking oven than the one that had earlier been pioneered by Frick. He also served as a director of various other companies, including the Pennsylvania Railroad and the American Locomotive Company. Mellon was deeply involved in the financing of World War I, as the Union Trust Company and other Mellon institutions provided millions of dollars in loans to the United Kingdom and France, and Mellon himself invested in Liberty bonds.

=== Old Overholt whiskey ===
In 1887, Frick, Andrew, and Richard Mellon jointly purchased Old Overholt, a whiskey distillery located in West Overton, Pennsylvania. At the time, Old Overholt was one of the largest and most respected whiskey producers in the country. In 1907, as prohibition became more popular across the country, Frick and Mellon removed their names from the distilling license but retained ownership in the company. It is believed that Mellon's connections in the Treasury Department are what allowed the company to secure a medicinal permit during Prohibition. This permit allowed Overholt to sell existing whiskey stocks to druggists for medicinal use. When Frick died in December 1919, he left his share to Mellon. In 1925, under pressure from prohibitionists, Mellon sold his share of the company to a New York grocer.

=== Early involvement in politics ===
Like his father, Mellon consistently supported the Republican Party, and he frequently donated to state and local party leaders. Through state party boss Matthew Quay, Mellon influenced legislators to place high tariffs on aluminum products in the McKinley Tariff of 1890. During the early 20th century, Mellon was dismayed by the rise of progressivism and the antitrust actions pursued by the presidential administrations of Theodore Roosevelt, William Howard Taft, and Woodrow Wilson. He especially opposed the Taft administration's investigations into Alcoa, which in 1912 signed a consent decree rather than going to trial. In the aftermath of World War I, he provided financial support to Henry Cabot Lodge and other Republicans in their successful campaign to prevent ratification of the Treaty of Versailles. Mellon attended the 1920 Republican National Convention as a nominal supporter of Pennsylvania Governor William Cameron Sproul (Mellon hoped Senator Philander Knox would win the nomination), but the convention chose Senator Warren G. Harding of Ohio as the party's presidential nominee. Mellon strongly approved of the party's conservative platform, and he served as a key fundraiser for Harding during the presidential campaign.

== Political career, 1921–1933 ==
=== Harding administration ===
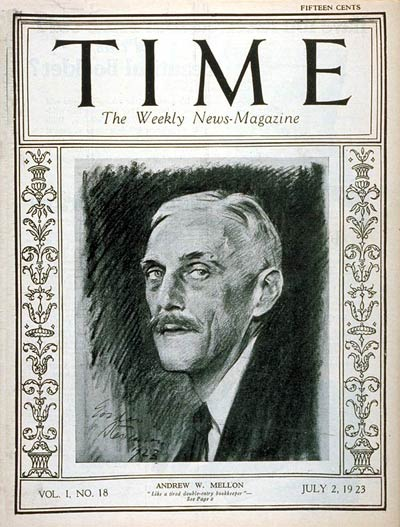
Time cover, July 2, 1923

Following Harding's victory in the 1920 presidential election, Harding considered various candidates for Secretary of the Treasury, including Frank Lowden, John W. Weeks, Charles Dawes, and, at the urging of Senator Knox, Andrew Mellon. By 1920, Mellon was little-known outside of banking circles, but his potential appointment to the cabinet received strong support from bankers and Pennsylvania Republican leaders like Knox, Senator Boies Penrose, and Governor Sproul. Mellon was reluctant to enter public life due to concerns about privacy and a belief that his ownership of various businesses, including Old Overholt distillery, would be a political liability. But Mellon also wanted to retire from active participation in business, and he saw a cabinet position as a prestigious capstone to his career.

Mellon agreed to accept appointment as Secretary of the Treasury in February 1921, and his nomination was quickly confirmed by the United States Senate. Though Mellon's supporters believed that he was highly qualified to address the economic issues facing the country, critics of the Harding administration saw the Mellon appointment as a sign that Harding would "reseat the power of special privileged interests, the powers of avarice and greed, the powers that seek self-aggrandizement at the expense of the general public". Harding paired the nomination of Mellon with that of Secretary of Commerce Herbert Hoover, who was distrusted by many of the same Senate Republicans who favored Mellon's candidacy. Before joining the cabinet, Mellon sold his banking stock to his brother, Richard, but he continued to hold his non-banking stock. Through Richard and other business associates, Mellon continued to be involved with the major decisions of the Mellon business empire during his time in public service, and he occasionally lobbied congressmen on behalf of his businesses. His fortune continued to grow, and at one point in the 1920s he paid more in federal income tax than any other individual save John Rockefeller and Henry Ford.

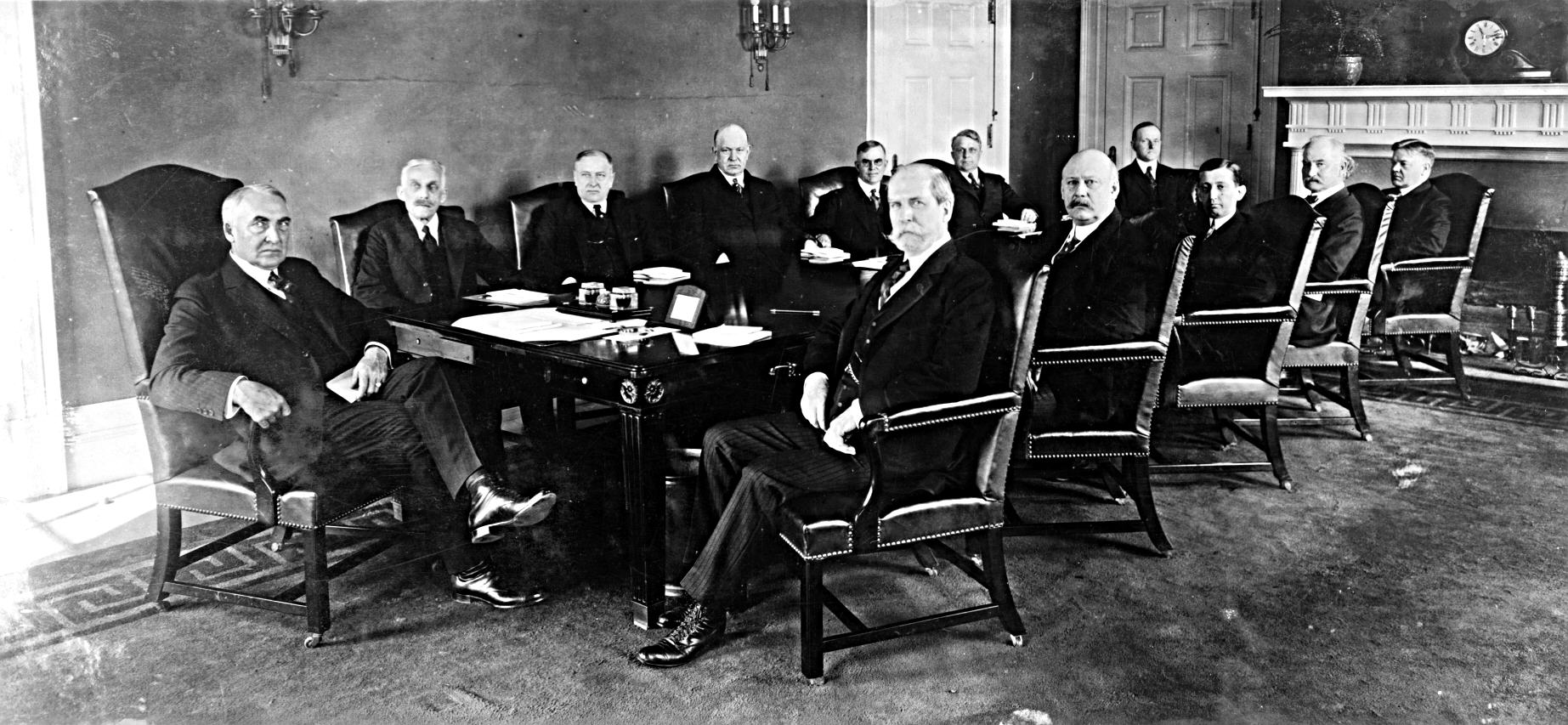
Mellon, second from left, seated next to President Warren Harding during a 1921 Cabinet meeting

As Treasury Secretary, Mellon focused on balancing the budget and paying off World War I debts in the midst of the Depression of 1920–21; he was largely unconcerned with international affairs and economic matters such as the unemployment rate. To Mellon's chagrin, his department was charged with enforcing Prohibition; he did not believe in teetotaling himself and viewed the law as unenforceable. Aside from balancing the budget, Mellon's top priority was an overhaul of the federal tax code. The income tax had become a major part of the federal government's revenue system with the passage of the Revenue Act of 1913, and federal taxation on income had increased during World War I to provide funding for the war effort. According to M. Susan Murnane, major reforms to the federal income tax in the aftermath of World War I were "inevitable", but the exact nature of the tax system in the 1920s was debated by conservatives and progressives within the Republican Party. Unlike the progressives in his party, Mellon rejected the redistributive nature of the taxation system that had been left in place by the Wilson administration. Owing in part to the high debts left over from the war, Mellon did not join with some conservatives in the party, who favored the virtual abolition of the income tax in favor of high tariff rates, excise taxes, a national sales tax, or some combination thereof.

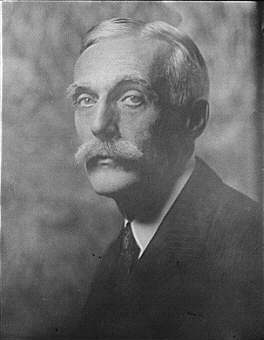
Portrait photograph of A.W. Mellon, 1924

Mellon instead advocated the retention of a progressive income tax that would serve as an important, but not primary, source of revenue for the federal government. His so-called "scientific taxation" was designed to maximize federal revenue while minimizing the impact on business and industry. The central tenet of Mellon's tax plan was a reduction of the surtax, a progressive tax that affected only high-income earners. Mellon argued that such a reduction would minimize tax avoidance and would not affect federal revenue because it would lead to greater economic growth. He hoped that tax reform would encourage high earners to move their savings from tax-exempt state and municipal bonds to taxable, higher yield industrial stocks. Though much of the tax plan that he proposed had been developed by former Wilson administration officials Russell Cornell Leffingwell and Seymour Parker Gilbert, the press generally referred to it as the "Mellon Plan".

The Revenue Act of 1918 had set a top marginal income tax rate of 73% and a corporate tax of approximately 10%. Due in part to the size of the U.S. public debt, which had grown from $1 billion before the war to $24 billion in 1921, the provisions of the Revenue Act of 1918 remained in place when Harding took office. In 1921, the Treasury Department and the House Ways and Means Committee jointly prepared a bill setting the top marginal rate at the level advocated by Mellon, but opposition in the Senate from progressives like Senator Robert M. La Follette limited the size of the tax cuts. In November 1921, Congress passed and Harding signed the Revenue Act of 1921, which raised personal tax exemptions and lowered the top marginal tax rate to 58%. Because it differed from his original proposals, Mellon was displeased by the bill. He also strongly disapproved of a "Bonus Bill" passed by Congress that would provide for additional compensation to veterans of World War I, partly because he feared it would interfere with his plans to reduce debt and taxes. With Mellon's support, Harding vetoed the bill, and Congress failed to override the veto.

=== Coolidge administration ===
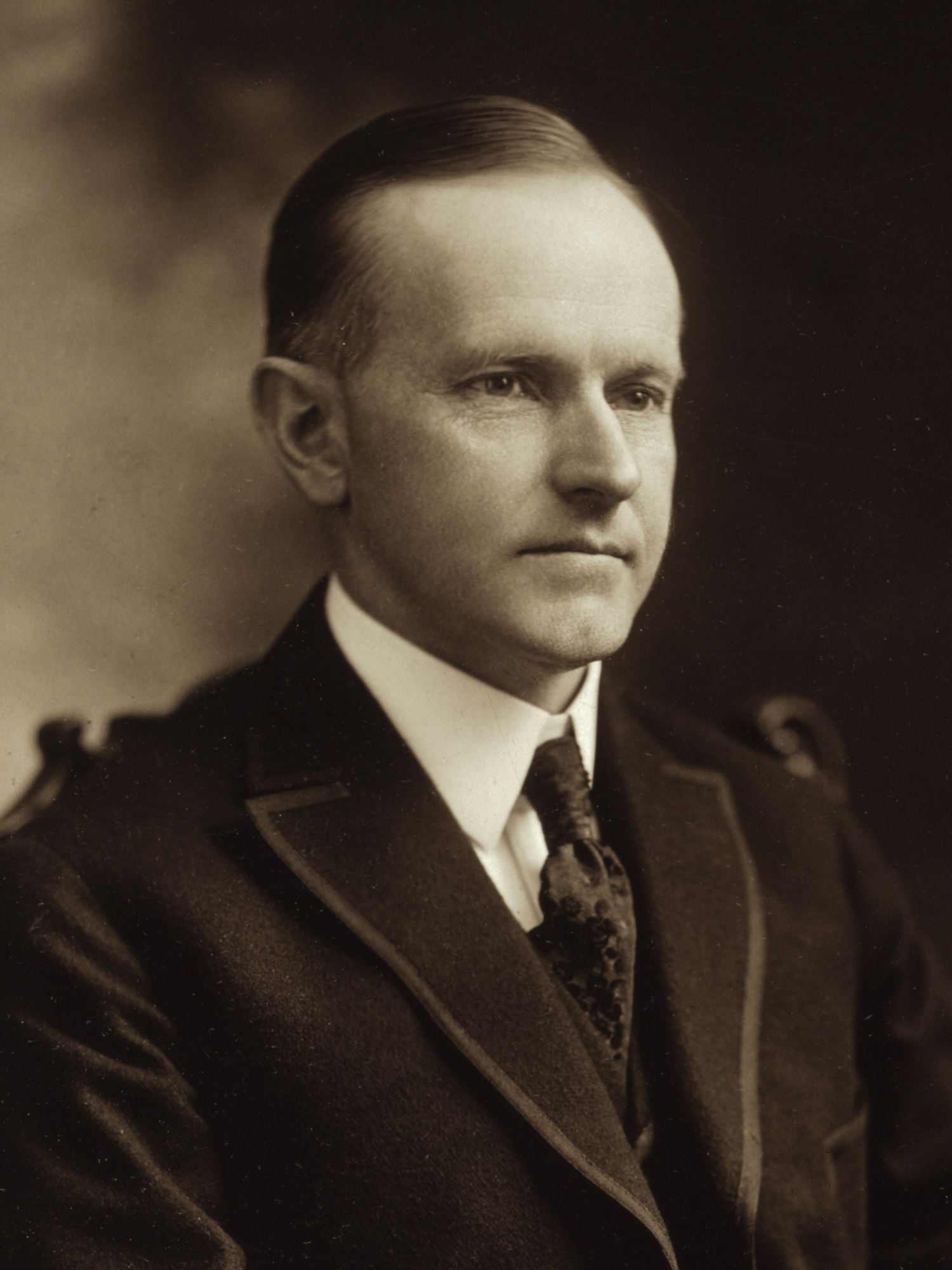
President Calvin Coolidge favored Mellon's economic policies.

As the economy recovered from recession and began to experience the prosperity of the Roaring Twenties, Mellon emerged as one of the most renowned figures in the Harding administration. One admiring congressman referred to Mellon as the "greatest Secretary of the Treasury since Alexander Hamilton". Harding died after suffering a stroke in August 1923, and he was succeeded by Vice President Calvin Coolidge. Mellon enjoyed closer relations with President Coolidge than he had with President Harding, and Coolidge and Mellon shared similar views on most major issues, including the necessity for further tax cuts. William Allen White, a contemporary journalist, stated that "so completely did Andrew Mellon dominate the White House in the days when the Coolidge administration was at its zenith that it would be fair to call the administration the reign of Coolidge and Mellon."

Coolidge, Mellon, business organizations, and administration allies conducted a publicity campaign designed to convince wavering congressmen to support Mellon's tax plan. Their efforts were opposed by the coalition of Democrats and progressive Republicans that exercised effective control over the 68th Congress. In February 1924, the House Ways and Means Committee approved of a bill based on Mellon's plan, but an alliance of progressive Republicans and Democrats engineered passage of an alternative tax bill written by Democrat John Nance Garner; Garner's plan also reduced income taxes but set the top marginal tax rate at 46% rather than Mellon's preferred 33%. In June 1924, Coolidge signed the Revenue Act of 1924, which contained the income tax rates of Garner's bill and also increased the estate tax. Coolidge signed the bill but simultaneously called for further tax cuts. Congress also rejected Mellon's proposed constitutional amendment that would have barred the issuance of tax-exempt securities and, over Coolidge's veto, authorized a bonus to World War I veterans. Mellon did, however, win one legislative victory, as he convinced Congress to create the Board of Tax Appeals to adjudicate disputes between taxpayers and the government.

Mellon had originally planned to retire after one presidential term but decided to remain in the cabinet in the hope of presiding over the full enactment of his taxation proposals. In the 1924 presidential election, the Republicans campaigned on further tax cuts, while both the Democrats and third-party candidate Robert La Follette denounced Mellon's tax proposals as "a device to relieve multi-millionaires at the expense of other taxpayers". Buoyed by the strong economy, and overcoming the scandals of the Harding years, Coolidge won re-election by a decisive margin. Coolidge saw his victory as a mandate to pursue his favored economic policies, including further tax cuts.

When Congress reconvened after the 1924 elections, it immediately began working on another bill designed to lower tax rates on the highest earners. In February 1926, Coolidge signed the Revenue Act of 1926, which reduced the top marginal rate to 25%. Mellon was extremely pleased by the passage of the act, because, unlike the Revenue Act of 1921 and the Revenue Act of 1924, the Revenue Act of 1926 closely reflected Mellon's proposals. In addition to cutting tax rates on top earners, the act also raised the personal exemption for federal income taxes, abolished the gift tax, reduced the estate tax rate, and repealed a provision that had required the public disclosure of federal income tax returns. Meanwhile, the booming economy fostered a $400 million budget surplus in 1926, and the country's national debt dropped from $24 billion in early 1921 to $19.6 billion at the end of fiscal year 1926. Government revenues increased considerably under Mellon's plan, largely collected from higher-income earners.

With his top priority of tax reform accomplished, Mellon increasingly turned over management of the Treasury Department to his deputy, Ogden L. Mills. After the 1926 elections, Mellon and Mills sought to cut the corporate tax and fully repeal the estate tax. The Revenue Act of 1928 did indeed cut the corporate tax, but the estate tax was left unchanged. Mellon also focused on the construction of new federal buildings, and his efforts led to the construction of several buildings in the Federal Triangle. In 1928, Mellon stated that "in no other nation, and at no other time in the history of the world, have so many people enjoyed such a high degree of prosperity or maintained a standard of living comparable to that which prevails throughout this country today."

Responsibility for foreign relations lay with the State Department rather than the Treasury Department, and Benjamin Strong Jr. and other central bankers took the lead with regard to international monetary policy, but Mellon nonetheless exercised some influence in foreign affairs. He strongly opposed the cancellation of European debts from World War I but recognized that Britain and other countries would be unable to pay those debts without a renegotiation of terms. In 1923, Mellon and British Chancellor of the Exchequer Stanley Baldwin negotiated an agreement in which Britain promised to pay off the debts over a 62-year period. After the adoption of the Dawes Plan, Mellon reached debt settlements with several other European countries. After protracted negotiations, the United States and France agreed to the Mellon-Berenger Agreement, which reduced France's debt and set terms for repayment.

=== Hoover administration ===
==== 1928 election ====
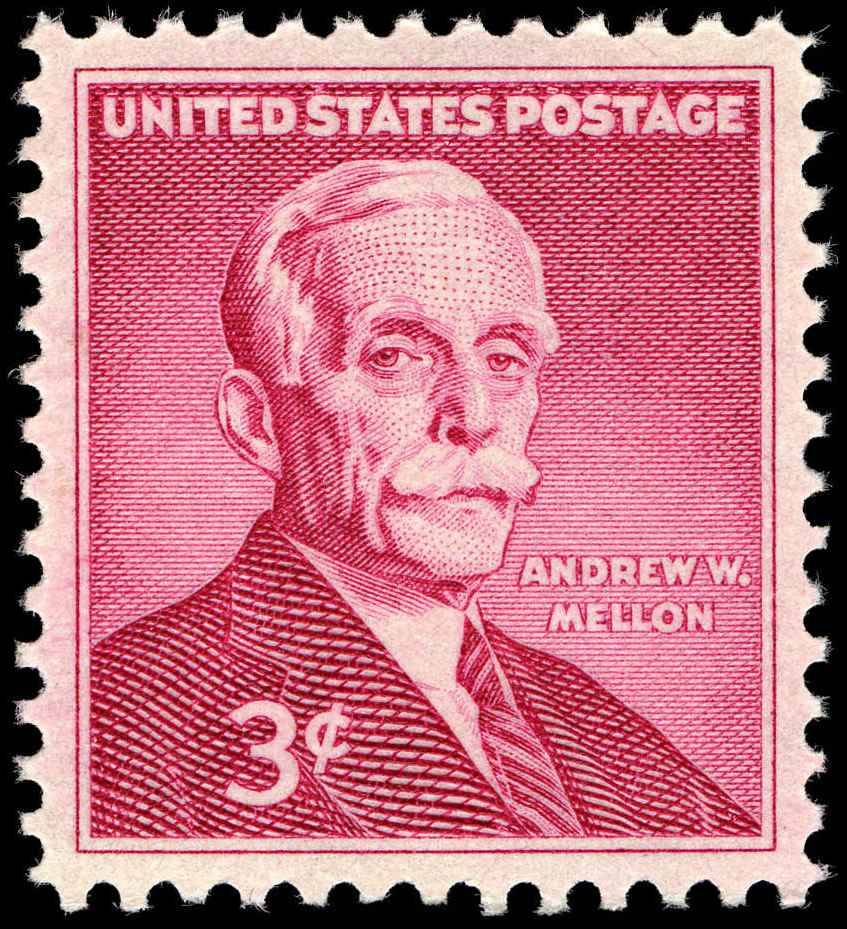
Mellon on US stamp

Coolidge surprised many observers by announcing that he would not seek another term in August 1927. The decision left Hoover as the presumed front-runner for the 1928 presidential election, but many conservatives within the party opposed Hoover's candidacy. The conservative resistance to Hoover centered around Mellon, who controlled Pennsylvania's delegation at the 1928 Republican National Convention and was influential with Republicans throughout the country. Though they had maintained an amicable relationship in public, Mellon privately distrusted Hoover, resented Hoover's engagement in the affairs of other cabinet departments and feared that a President Hoover would move away from Mellon's tax policies. Several Republicans urged Mellon to run for president, but Mellon believed that he was too old to seek the presidency. Mellon attempted to convince Coolidge or Charles Evans Hughes to run, but neither heeded his appeals. In the months before the 1928 Republican Convention, Mellon maintained his neutrality in the presidential race, but with no compelling alternative Republican candidate willing to run, Mellon finally threw his support behind Hoover. With Mellon's backing, Hoover won the Republican nomination on the first ballot of the convention, and he went on to defeat Al Smith in the 1928 presidential election. Defying widespread expectations that he would retire, Mellon chose to stay on as Secretary of the Treasury. Along with Secretary of Agriculture James Wilson and Secretary of Labor James J. Davis, Mellon is one of only three cabinet members to serve in the same post under three consecutive presidents.

==== Great Depression ====
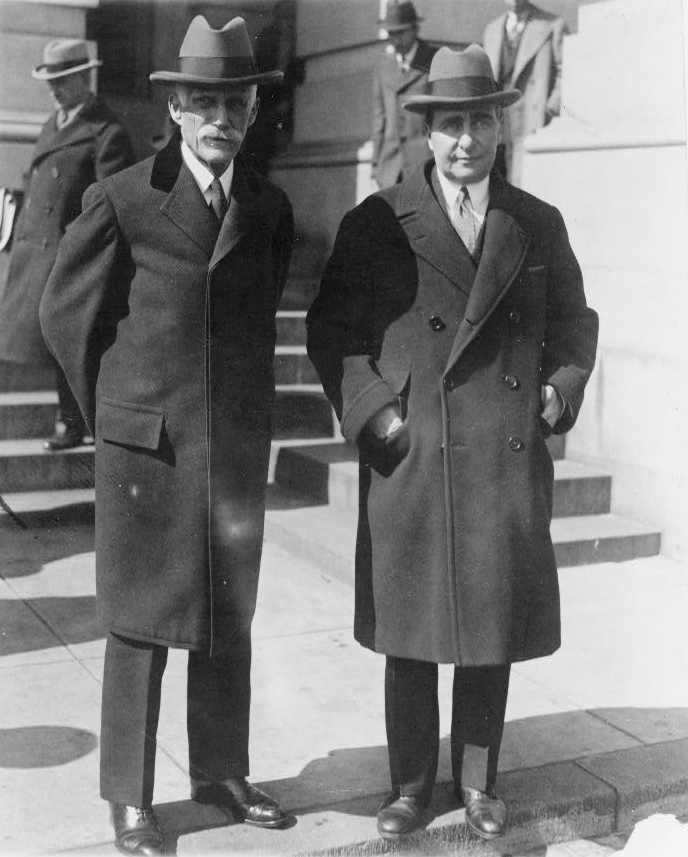
Mellon and his successor as Secretary of the Treasury, Ogden L. Mills

Secretary Mellon had helped persuade the Federal Reserve Board to lower interest rates in 1921 and 1924; lower interest rates contributed to a booming economy, but they also encouraged stock market speculation. In 1928, responding to increasing fears of the dangers of speculation and a booming stock market, the Federal Reserve Board began raising interest rates. Mellon favored another interest rate increase in 1929, and in August 1929 the Federal Reserve Board raised the discount rate to six percent. The higher rate failed to curb speculation, and the activity on the stock market continued to grow. In October 1929, the New York Stock Exchange suffered the worst crash in its history in what was called "Black Tuesday". As the vast majority of Americans did not own shares in the stock market, the crash did not immediately have disastrous effects on the U.S. economy as a whole. Mellon had little sympathy for the speculators who lost their money, and he was philosophically opposed to an interventionist economic policy designed to address the stock market crash. Nonetheless, Mellon immediately began calling for cuts to the discount rate, which would reach two percent in mid-1930, and successfully urged Congress to pass a bill providing for temporary, across-the-board tax cuts. Mellon supported the idea of asset liquidation to balance budgets, even if it meant shutting down entire industries.

By mid-1930, many, including Mellon, believed that the economy had already experienced the worst effects of the stock market crash. He did not object to the Smoot–Hawley Tariff Act, which raised tariff rates to one of the highest levels in U.S. history. Despite the optimism of Hoover and Mellon, in late 1930 the economy went into a deep slump, as gross national product declined dramatically, and numerous workers lost their jobs. While numerous banks failed, Democrats won control of Congress in the 1930 mid-term elections. As the economy declined, so did Mellon's popularity, which was further damaged by his opposition to another bonus bill for veterans. In mid-1931, the country entered a deep depression, and, at Hoover's request, Mellon negotiated a moratorium on German debt repayments. After Mellon returned to the United States in August 1931, he was confronted by another series of bank failures. Among the banks that failed was the Bank of Pittsburgh, the lone remaining major Pittsburgh bank not controlled by the Mellon family. Again, following Hoover's lead, Mellon presided over the creation of the National Credit Association, a voluntary initiative among the larger banks that was designed to assist failing institutions. As the National Credit Association proved to be ineffective at stemming the tide of bank failures, Congress and the Hoover administration established the Reconstruction Finance Corporation to provide federal loans to banks.

With the unemployment rate approaching twenty percent, Mellon became one of the most "loathed leaders" in the United States, second only to Hoover himself. Facing this unprecedented economic catastrophe, Mellon urged Hoover to refrain from using the government to intervene in the depression. Mellon believed that economic recessions, such as those that had occurred in 1873 and 1907, were a necessary part of the business cycle because they purged the economy. In his memoirs, Hoover wrote that Mellon advised him to "liquidate labor, liquidate stocks, liquidate the farmers, liquidate real estate. Purge the rottenness out of the system. High costs of living and high living will come down. ... enterprising people will pick up the wrecks from less competent people."

Facing a large deficit, Mellon and Mills called for a return to the tax rates set by the Revenue Act of 1924 and also sought new taxes on automobiles, gasoline, and other items. Congress responded by passing the Revenue Act of 1932, which included many of the Treasury Department's proposals. In early 1932, Congressman Wright Patman of Texas initiated impeachment proceedings against Mellon, contending that Mellon had violated numerous federal laws designed to prevent conflicts of interest. Though Mellon had defeated similar investigations in the past, his falling popularity left him unable to effectively counter Patman's charges. Hoover removed Mellon from Washington by offering him the position of ambassador to the United Kingdom. Mellon accepted the post, and Mills replaced his former boss as Secretary of the Treasury.

Mellon arrived in Britain in April 1932, receiving a friendly reception from a country he had often visited over the previous thirty years. From his post, he watched the collapse of the international economic order, including the debt accords that he had helped negotiate. He also convinced the British to allow Gulf Oil to operate in Kuwait, a British protectorate in the oil-rich region of the Persian Gulf. Defying Mellon's expectations, Hoover was defeated by Franklin D. Roosevelt in the 1932 presidential election. Mellon left office when Hoover's term ended in March 1933, returning to private life after twelve years of government service.

=== Pennsylvania politics, 1921–1933 ===
Knox and Penrose both died in 1921, leaving a power vacuum in Pennsylvania Republican politics. Along with his nephew, William Larimer Mellon, Mellon became an influential player in Pennsylvania politics, and their support helped ensure the elections of Senator David A. Reed and Senator George W. Pepper in 1922. Mellon was unable to assert the same level of control that Boies Penrose had had over state politics, and his leadership of the state party was challenged by William Scott Vare of Philadelphia and progressive leader Gifford Pinchot, who won the 1922 Pennsylvania gubernatorial election. Nonetheless, Mellon would continue to exert an important influence on Pennsylvania politics throughout the 1920s, especially in senatorial elections and in Allegheny County. Mellon's influence over state politics waned in the early 1930s, as the progressive allies of Governor Pinchot took control of the state Republican Party.

== Later days ==
Numerous financial institutions failed in the months prior to Roosevelt's inauguration, but Mellon National Bank, the Union Trust Company, and another Mellon banking operation, Mellbank Corporation, were all able to avoid closure. Mellon strongly opposed Roosevelt's New Deal policies, especially the 1933 Banking Act, which required separation between commercial and investment banking. Mellon believed that the various New Deal policies, including Social Security and unemployment insurance, undermined the free market system that had produced one of the largest economies in the world. Aside from banking reform, other New Deal policies, including regulations on utilities and coal mines and laws designed to promote labor unions, also affected Mellon's business empire. Additionally, the Revenue Act of 1934 and the Revenue Act of 1935 rescinded many of Mellon's tax policies and contained other provisions that were designed to increase taxation on top earners and corporations.

Even after leaving office, Mellon continued to be vilified by many in the public, and in 1933 Harvey O'Connor published a popular and unfavorable biography, Mellon's Millions. Democrats won effective control of Allegheny County in the 1933 elections, and the following year Democrat Joseph F. Guffey won Pennsylvania's Senate election and George Howard Earle III won the state's gubernatorial election. Mellon endured numerous attacks during these campaigns, and his unpopularity in Pittsburgh led him to spend most of his final years in Washington rather than his home town.

In the 1930s, the Roosevelt administration conducted several high-profile tax evasion prosecutions against individuals such as Thomas W. Lamont and Jimmy Walker. In response to accusations levied by Republican Congressman Louis Thomas McFadden of Pennsylvania in early 1933, Attorney General Homer Cummings began an inquiry into Mellon's tax history. Between February 1935 and May 1936, the Board of Tax Appeals heard a widely covered case in which the federal government accused Mellon of tax fraud. During the proceedings, Mellon divulged numerous details of his business career that had previously been unknown to the public.

Mellon was diagnosed with cancer in November 1936. His health declined in 1937, and he died on August 26, 1937. Newspapers across the country took note of his death. Secretary of the Treasury Henry Morgenthau Jr. stated that Mellon had lived through "an epoch in the economic history of the nation, and his passing takes one of the most important industrial and financial figures of our time." Months after Mellon's death, the Board of Tax Appeals handed down a ruling exonerating Mellon of all tax fraud charges.

== Personal life ==
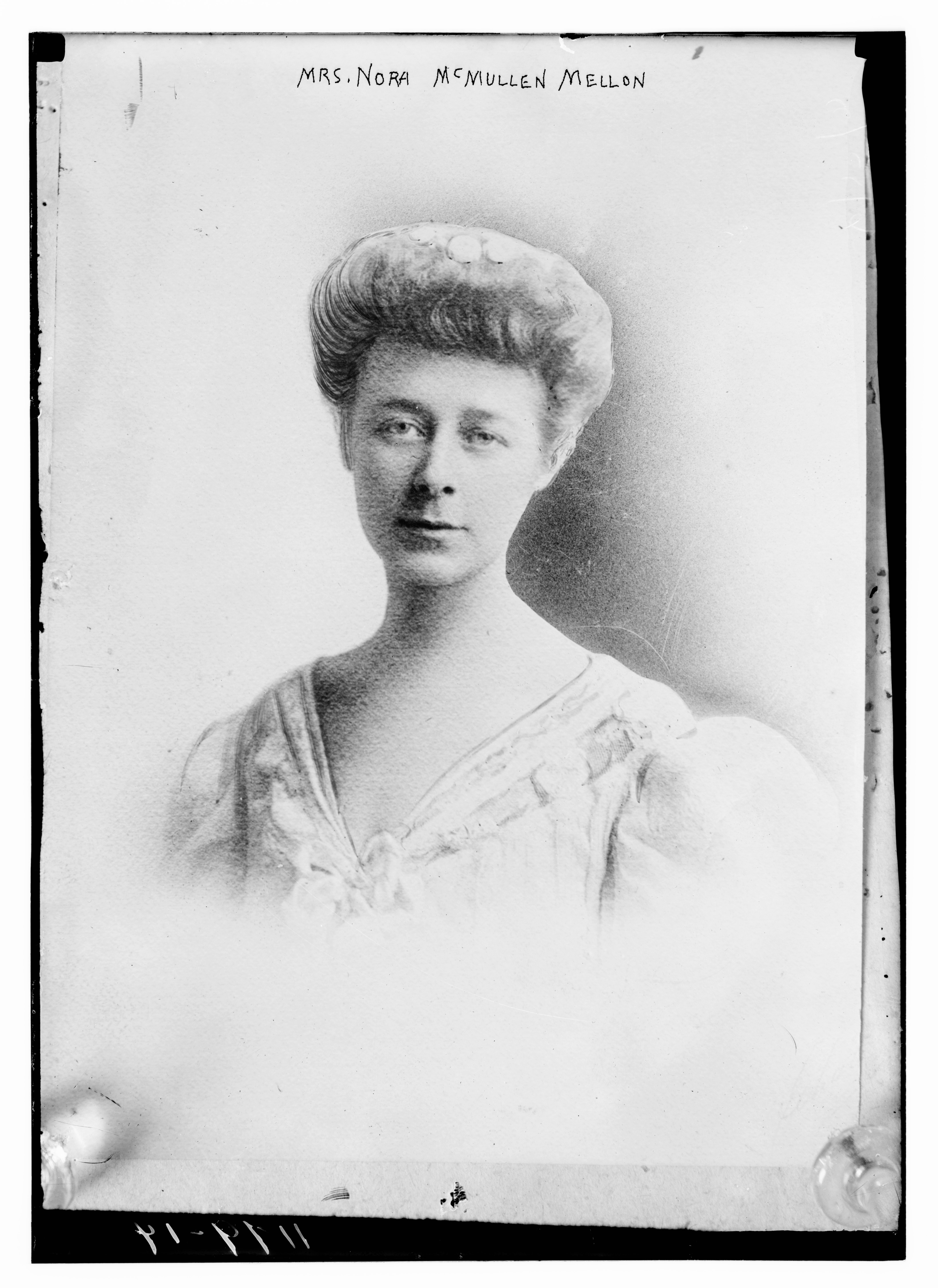
Nora McMullen Mellon

In the early 1880s, Mellon had a serious relationship with Fannie Larimer Jones, but he broke off the relationship after learning that she was suffering from tuberculosis. After this experience, Mellon refrained from courting women for several years. In 1898, while traveling with Frick and Frick's wife to Europe, Mellon met Nora McMullen, a nineteen-year-old Englishwoman of Ulster Scots ancestry. Mellon visited McMullen's home of Hertford Castle in 1898 and 1899, and, after a period of courtship, the couple married in 1900. Nora gave birth to a daughter, Ailsa, in 1901. Nora disliked living in Pittsburgh, and she was unhappy in her marriage. By the end of 1903, she had begun an affair with Alfred George Curphey, who would also later be involved with the wife of George Vivian, 4th Baron Vivian. Mellon and Nora eventually reconciled, and in 1907 she gave birth to a son, Paul. The reconciliation proved short-lived, as Nora took up with Curphey again in 1908 and requested a divorce the following year. To avoid a public scandal, Andrew reluctantly agreed to a separation in 1909. Seeking to hold divorce proceedings privately before a judge rather than publicly before a jury, in 1911 Mellon convinced the Pennsylvania legislature to amend a law that had required a jury trial in divorce proceedings. In response, Nora attacked Mellon in the press, and the divorce proceedings were widely covered by the media. Nora went so far to contest the divorce that she made an appeal to King George of England and parliament. In 1912, Mellon and Nora finally agreed on a divorce settlement, largely on Mellon's terms.

Mellon did not remarry. Nora lived in Pittsburgh for several years before eventually settling in the Hudson Valley, and the two children alternated living with either parent. In 1923, Nora married Harvey Arthur Lee, a British-born antiques dealer 14 years her junior. Two years after the Lees' divorce in 1928, Nora Lee resumed the surname Mellon, at the request of her son, Paul. In the 1920s, while Mellon served as Secretary of the Treasury, Ailsa was courted by several influential men, including Otto Christian Archibald von Bismarck, Robert Horne, and Gelasio Caetani. In 1926, in the "greatest society event that the nation's capital had witnessed" since before World War I, Ailsa married David K. E. Bruce, son of Democratic Senator William Cabell Bruce of Maryland. After attending Yale University and the University of Cambridge, Paul briefly worked at Mellon National Bank. He later settled in Virginia, becoming a well-known philanthropist. Mellon's nephew, Richard King Mellon, succeeded Andrew as the head of the Mellon financial empire.

== Philanthropy and art collection ==
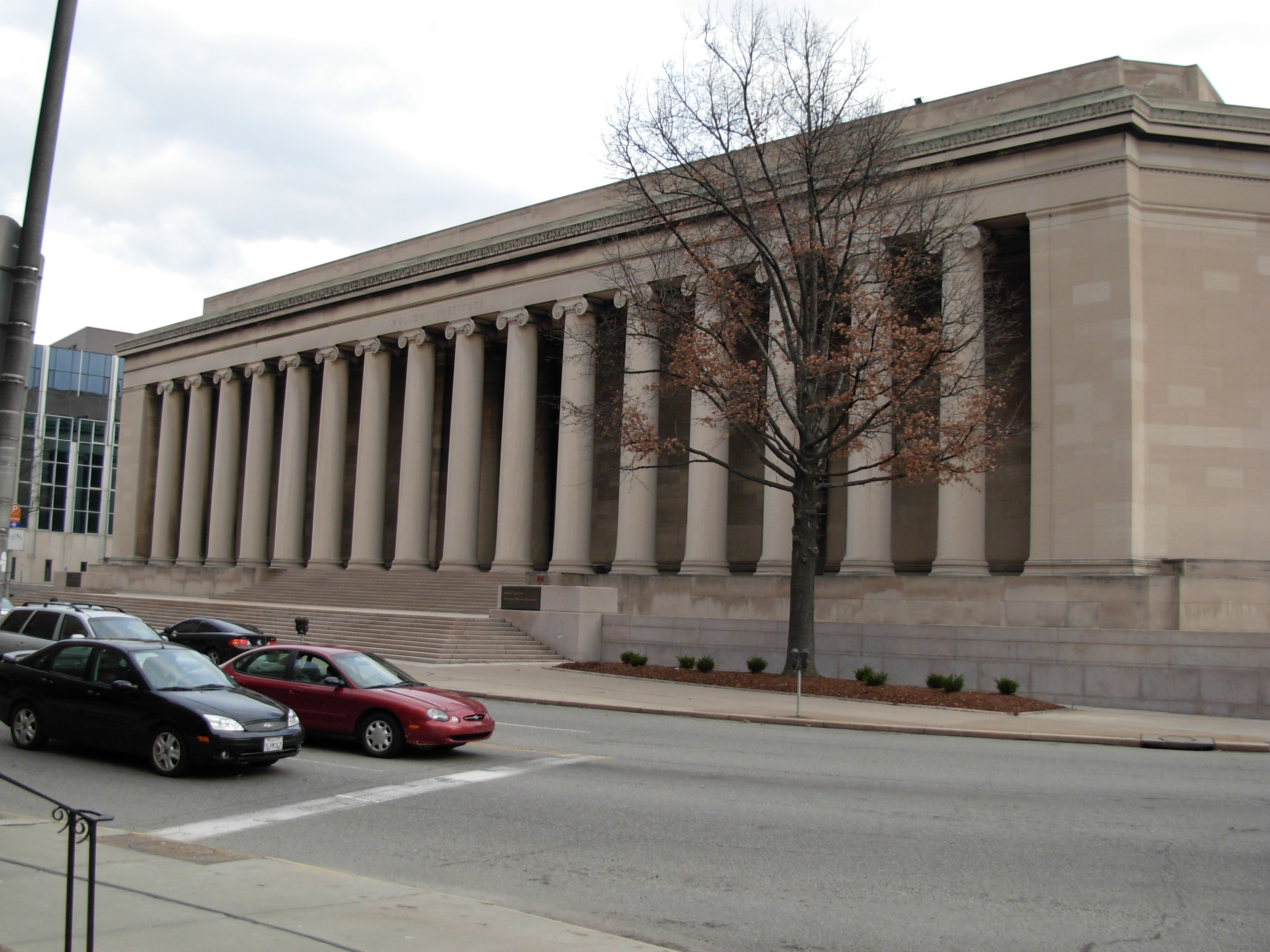
Mellon Institute of Industrial Research

The Alba Madonna by Raphael, was bought for the Hermitage by Emperor Nicholas I of Russia in 1836. It was sold to Andrew Mellon by the Soviet Government in 1931 for $1,166,400, the largest sum ever paid for a painting until that time.

The Annunciation by Jan van Eyck (1434) was purchased for the Hermitage by Emperor Nicholas I of Russia in 1850. It was sold to Andrew Mellon in June 1930 for $502,899.

Emulating his father, Mellon eschewed philanthropy for much of his life, but in the early 1900s, he began donating to local organizations such as the YMCA. Mellon committed to his first large-scale act of philanthropy in 1913, when he and his brother, Richard, established the Mellon Institute of Industrial Research as a department of the University of Pittsburgh. In 1967, the institute merged with the Carnegie Institute of Technology to form Carnegie Mellon University. Mellon also served as an alumni president and trustee of the University of Pittsburgh, and made several major donations to the school, including the land on which the Cathedral of Learning and Heinz Chapel were constructed. In total it is estimated that Mellon donated over $43 million to the University of Pittsburgh.

Encouraged by Frick and guided by Charles Carstairs, Mellon began collecting art in the mid-to-late 1890s. Over the ensuing decades, his art collection continued to grow as he purchased pieces from Knoedler and Joseph Duveen, and during the 1920s his collection was generally considered to be one of the finest art collections in Washington. In the early 1930s, he purchased twenty-one paintings from the Soviet Union's Hermitage Museum in the Soviet sale of Hermitage paintings. Some of these were among the best paintings held by the Hermitage. They were all subsequently given to the National Gallery of Art.

Mellon decided to use his fortune and art collection to establish a national art museum in Washington modeled after the National Gallery in London. In 1936, Mellon presented President Roosevelt with an offer to establish a national art museum to which Mellon would donate his art collection as well as an endowment, while the federal government would pay for the institution's upkeep. He conditioned the offer on the establishment of a board of trustees, a majority of whom would be chosen by Mellon. Despite the ongoing tax case against Mellon, the Roosevelt administration accepted the offer, and Congress passed legislation authorizing the construction of the National Gallery of Art on Mellon's terms. The National Gallery of Art (now known as the West Building) opened in 1941. Two of his children, Paul Mellon and Ailsa Mellon Bruce, were subsequently among the major donors to the collection. The Mellon Foundation and several family members funded a new museum building, called the East Building, which opened in 1978. Mellon's friend and former employee, David E. Finley Jr., would later preside over the establishment of the National Portrait Gallery, which also hosts several paintings donated by Mellon.

Mellon was initiated to the Scottish Rite Freemasonry, till he raised the 33rd and highest degree.

== Legacy ==
=== Memorials ===
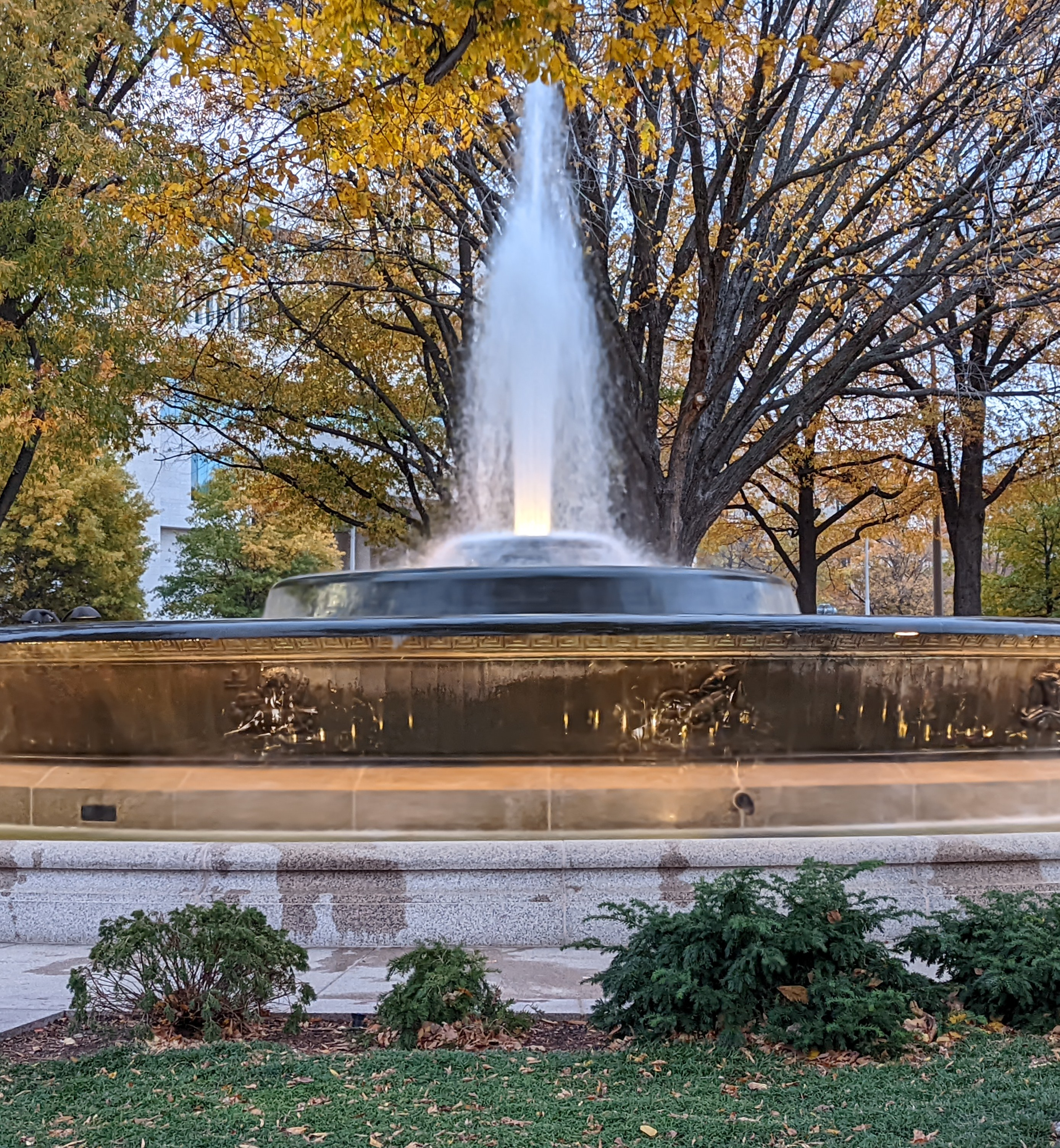
Andrew W. Mellon Memorial Fountain

The Andrew W. Mellon Memorial Fountain in Washington was created by Sidney Waugh and was dedicated in May 1952 by Harry S. Truman. Washington, D.C., also hosts the Andrew W. Mellon Auditorium and the Andrew Mellon Building. The Andrew W. Mellon Foundation, the product of the merger of the Avalon Foundation and the Old Dominion Foundation (set up separately by his children), is named in his honor, as is the 378-foot US Coast Guard Cutter Mellon (WHEC-717).

=== In popular culture ===
Andrew W. Mellon appears in the HBO drama series Boardwalk Empire, in the fifth, eighth and twelfth episodes of the third season, in his capacity as Secretary of the Treasury. His character is played by Carnegie Mellon alumnus James Cromwell.

The fictional town "Melonville" was named for the Mellons and the site of the Canadian sketch comedy series Second City Television.

In the alternate history/time travel story "A Slip in Time" by S. M. Stirling, featuring a history in which the First World War was avoided and the Austro-Hungarian Empire survived, Andrew Mellon was the President of the United States in 1926.

Mellon is the subject of three unflattering chapters in Matt Stoller's 2019 book, Goliath: The 100 Year War Between Monopoly Power and Democracy, which recounts efforts by populists in Washington (namely, Congressman Wright Patman; Roosevelt administration lawyer Robert H. Jackson; and Ferdinand Pecora, attorney for the Senate Banking Committee) to expose Mellon's crimes and abuse of power for personal gain.

== See also ==
- List of Mellon family foundations
- List of richest Americans in history
- List of United States Cabinet members who have served more than eight years

== Works cited ==
- Cannadine, David (2006). Mellon: An American Life. A. A. Knopf. ISBN 978-0-679-45032-0.
- Keller, Robert R. (1982). "Supply-Side Economic Policies during the Coolidge-Mellon Era". Journal of Economic Issues. 16 (3): 773–790. doi:10.1080/00213624.1982.11504032. JSTOR 4225215.
- Love, Philip H. (2003) [1929]. Andrew W. Mellon: The Man and His Work. Kessinger Publishing. ISBN 978-0-7661-6111-5.
- Murnane, M. Susan (2004). "Selling Scientific Taxation: The Treasury Departments Campaign for Tax Reform in the 1920s". Law & Social Inquiry. 29 (4): 819–856. doi:10.1111/j.1747-4469.2004.tb01077.x. JSTOR 4092770. S2CID 155069922.
- Murray, Lawrence L. (1973). "Andrew W. Mellon, the Reluctant Candidate". The Pennsylvania Magazine of History and Biography. 97 (4): 511–531. JSTOR 20090792.
- Murray, Lawrence L. (1975). "The Mellons, Their Money, and the Mythical Machine: Organizational Politics in the Republican Twenties". Pennsylvania History: A Journal of Mid-Atlantic Studies. 42 (3): 220–241. JSTOR 27772290.
- Rusnak, Robert J. (1983). "Andrew W. Mellon: Reluctant Kingmaker". Presidential Studies Quarterly. 13 (2): 269–278. JSTOR 27547924.

Political offices
| Preceded by David F. Houston | U.S. Secretary of the Treasury; Served under: Warren G. Harding, Calvin Coolidge, Herbert Hoover; March 4, 1921 – February 12, 1932 | Succeeded by Ogden L. Mills |
Diplomatic posts
| Preceded by Charles G. Dawes | US Ambassador to the United Kingdom; 1932–1933 | Succeeded by Robert Worth Bingham |
Awards and achievements
| Preceded by Edward M. House | Cover of Time magazine July 2, 1923 | Succeeded by Mason M. Patrick |
| Preceded by John D. Rockefeller | Cover of Time magazine May 28, 1928 | Succeeded by John Dewey |
