= Pittsburgh and Beck's Run Railroad =

Overview
- Locale: Allegheny County, Pennsylvania
- Dates of operation: October 5, 1877–March 12, 1880
- Successor: Pittsburgh and Lake Erie Railroad

Technical
- Track gauge: 4 ft 8 1/2 in (1,435 mm) standard gauge

The Pittsburgh and Beck's Run Railroad was a short line railroad in Allegheny County, Pennsylvania, running from the Smithfield Street Bridge to the Jones and Laughlin Iron Works. It was purchased by the Pittsburgh and Lake Erie Railroad.

== See also ==
- Becks Run
