= Becks Run Road =

Street in Pittsburgh

Coordinates: 40.40228°N 79.97887°W

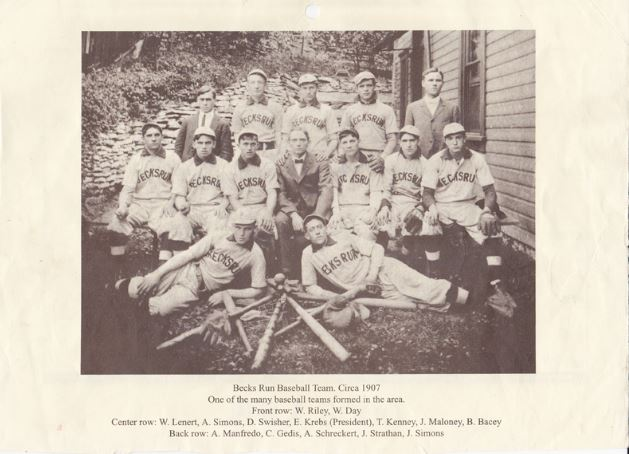
A photograph of the 1907 Becks Run Baseball Team (Pittsburgh, Pennsylvania

Becks Run Road is a street in the Pittsburgh metropolitan area. It connects Brownsville Road in the Carrick neighborhood of Pittsburgh with East Carson Street on the South Side. It is part of the Blue Belt road system. It is one of few roads connecting the low-lying areas along the Monongahela River with the higher elevations to the south, and is therefore heavily traveled, in spite of being steep and narrow in some sections.

The northern part of Becks Run Road follows part of the route of the H.B. Hays and Brothers Coal Railroad.
