= James H. Hays =

American businessman (1800–1876)

James Harden Hays
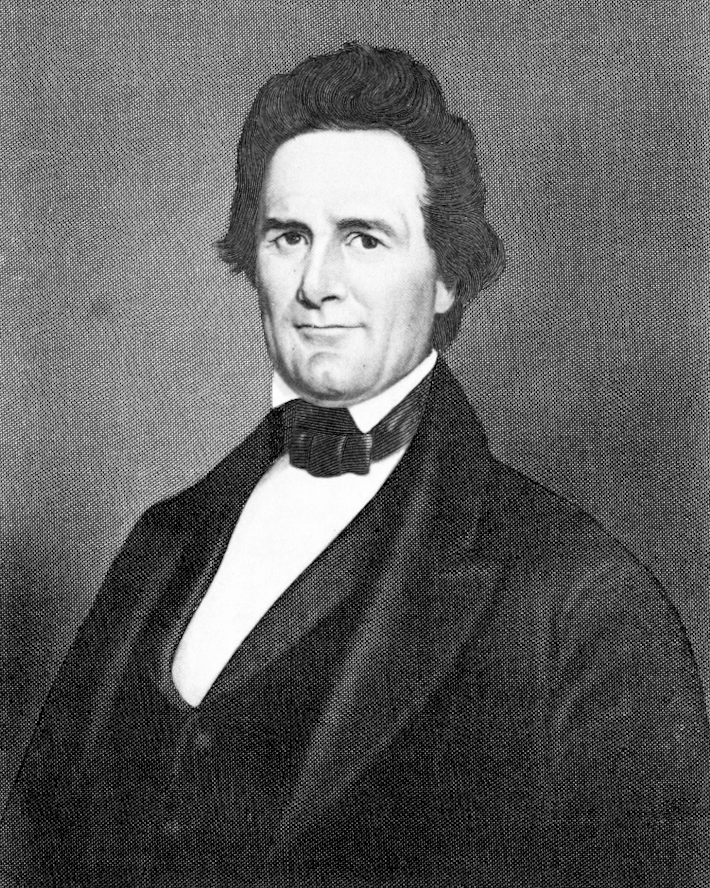
- Born: September 3, 1800; Mifflin Township, Allegheny County, Pennsylvania
- Died: March 30, 1876 (aged 75); Baldwin Township, Allegheny County, Pennsylvania
- Resting place: Allegheny Cemetery
- Known for: Start of coal industry in Allegheny County
- Spouse: Mary Cready (m. 1821)
- Children: Ann Eva Bughman, Mary Jane Wilson, Josephine Willock, Henry Blake Hays, Emmeline Davis, Sarah Watson, Agnes Wylie, James Harden Hays Jr., John Shoenberger Hays, Walter Forward Hays
- Parent(s): Jacob Hays, Jane Scott Harden

James Harden Hays (September 3, 1800 – March 30, 1876) was a pioneer of bituminous coal mining in Western Pennsylvania.

== Biography ==
James H. Hays was born in Mifflin Township, Allegheny County, Pennsylvania on September 3, 1800.

His first mine was opened in 1828, at the mouth of Street's Run, where it empties into the Monongahela River.

He died on March 30, 1876, at his home near Becks Run in Baldwin Township.
