= Monongahela River Consolidated Coal and Coke Company =

- Industry: Railroad and coal transportation company
- Predecessor: Formed by the merger of more than 80 independent coal mines and river transportation businesses in Kentucky and Pennsylvania
- Founded: 1899 in Pittsburgh, Pennsylvania
- Successor: Merged with the Pittsburgh Coal Company on December 24, 1915

The Monongahela River Consolidated Coal and Coke Company was a railroad and coal transportation company, founded in 1899 in Pittsburgh, Pennsylvania. It was formed by merging more than 80 independent coal mines and river transportation businesses, both in Pennsylvania and Kentucky. Initially, it had an agreement with the Pittsburgh Coal Company to ship its coal only by water, and not to compete with it by using rail transport, but the agreement was ended in 1902. It merged with the Pittsburgh Coal Company on 24 December 1915.

== Mine, Railroad, and Incline ==
The company had a 4 ft 8 1/2 in (1,435 mm) standard gauge railroad and mine along Becks Run. The railroad was originally opened in 1878 (the same year that the mine opened) as a narrow gauge line by the H.B. Hays and Brothers Coal Railroad.

== Sprague ==
One important part of the business was the riverboat Sprague, nicknamed Big Mama, a steam powered sternwheeler towboat capable of pushing 56 coal barges at once. A model of the Sprague is in the National Mississippi River Museum & Aquarium in Dubuque, Iowa.
