= Becks Run =

Coordinates: 40.411°N 79.956°W

Physical characteristics
- Source
  - location: Becks Run Road at East Agnew Avenue
- Mouth
  - location: Monongahela River
- Length: 2.82 mi (4.54 km)

Becks Run is a tributary of the Monongahela River in the United States. As an urban stream, it is heavily polluted, receiving combined sewer outflow from Carrick (Pittsburgh) and Mount Oliver, Pennsylvania.

== Geography and other notable features ==
There is a waterfall on a tributary, just downstream from a slate dump, near the intersection of Wagner Avenue and Mountain Avenue. There were coal mines along the stream, including Becks Run #2, owned by the estate of James H. Hays, served by an incline and the H.B. Hays and Brothers Coal Railroad. Other mines at various times were operated by the Birmingham Coal Company, H.G. Burghman, Jones & Laughlin, and the Monongahela River Consolidated Coal and Coke Company.

== History ==
The Pittsburgh and Beck's Run Railroad (1877–1880), which ran from the Smithfield Street Bridge to the Jones and Laughlin Iron Works, and was absorbed by the P&LE Railroad, was named after this tributary. A former town, located where Becks Run enters the Monongahela, was also named Becks Run.

== See also ==
- List of rivers of Pennsylvania
- Becks Run Road
