= Revenue Act of 1928 =

Act of the United States Congress

- Long title: An Act To reduce and equalize taxation, provide revenue, and for other purposes.
- Enacted by: the 70th United States Congress
- Effective: May 29, 1928

Citations
- Public law: Public Law 70-562
- Statutes at Large: 45 Stat. 791

Codification
- Acts amended: Revenue Act of 1926

Legislative history
- Introduced in the House as H.R. 1 by R‑OR Willis C. Hawleyth on December 5, 1927; Committee consideration by House Committee on Ways and Means · Senate Committee on Finance; Passed the House on December 15, 1927 (366–24); Passed the Senate on May 21, 1928 (Voice vote); Reported by the joint conference committee on May 1928; agreed to by the House on May 25, 1928 (Agreed to conference report) and by the Senate on May 25, 1928 (Agreed to conference report); Signed into law by President Calvin Coolidge on May 29, 1928

United States Supreme Court cases
- Helvering v. R.J. Reynolds Tobacco Co. (1939)

The Revenue Act of 1928 (May 29, 1928, ch. 852, 45 Stat. 791), formerly codified in part at 26 U.S.C. sec. 22(a), is a statute introduced as H.R. 1 and enacted by the 70th United States Congress in 1928 regarding tax policy.

Section 605 of the Act provides that "In case a regulation or Treasury decision relating to the internal revenue laws is amended by a subsequent regulation or Treasury decision, made by the Secretary or by the Commissioner with the approval of the Secretary, such subsequent regulation or Treasury decision may, with the approval of the Secretary, be applied without retroactive effect." (as cited in Helvering v. R.J. Reynolds Tobacco Co., 306 U.S. 110 (1939))

== Tax on corporations ==
A rate of 12 percent was levied on the net income of corporations.

== Tax on individuals ==
A normal tax and a surtax were levied against the net income of individuals as shown in the following table:

Revenue Act of 1928; Normal tax and surtax on individuals 45 Stat. 795
Net income (dollars)	Normal rate (percent)	Surtax rate (percent)	Combined rate (percent)
0	1.5	0	1.5
4,000	3	0	3
8,000	5	0	5
10,000	5	1	6
14,000	5	2	7
16,000	5	3	8
18,000	5	4	9
20,000	5	5	10
22,000	5	6	11
24,000	5	7	12
28,000	5	8	13
32,000	5	9	14
36,000	5	10	15
40,000	5	11	16
44,000	5	12	17
48,000	5	13	18
52,000	5	14	19
56,000	5	15	20
60,000	5	16	21
64,000	5	17	22
70,000	5	18	23
80,000	5	19	24
100,000	5	20	25

== Joint Committee on Taxation ==
In the Revenue Act of 1928, the Joint Committee's authority was extended to the review of all refunds or credits of any income, war-profits, excess-profits, or estate or gift tax in excess of $75,000. In addition, the Act required the Joint Committee to make an annual report to Congress with respect to such refunds and credits, including the names of all persons and corporations to whom amounts are credited or payments are made, together with the amounts credit or paid to each. Since 1928, the threshold for review of large tax refunds has been increased from $75,000 to $2 million in various steps and the taxes to which such review applies has been expanded. Other than that, the Joint Committee's responsibilities under the Internal Revenue Code have remained essentially unchanged since 1928.
