= Streets Run =

Stream in Pennsylvania, USA

Streets Run Tributary to Monongahela River
- Location of Streets Run mouth Streets Run (the United States)

Location
- Country: United States
- State: Pennsylvania
- County: Allegheny

Physical characteristics
- Source: Sawmill Run divide
  - location: Whitehall, Pennsylvania
  - coordinates: 40°21′07″N 079°58′58″W
  - elevation: 1,110 ft (340 m)
- Mouth: Monongahela River
  - location: Monongahela River near Sandcastle Water Park
  - coordinates: 40°23′48″N 079°55′59″W
  - elevation: 710 ft (220 m)
- Length: 5.11 mi (8.22 km)
- Basin size: 10.07 square miles (26.1 km^{2})
- Discharge
  - location: Monongahela River
  - average: 10.67 cu ft/s (0.302 m^{3}/s) at mouth with Monongahela River

Basin features
- Progression: generally northwest
- River system: Monongahela River
- Tributaries
  - left: Glass Run
  - right: unnamed tributaries

Streets Run is a 5.2-mile-long (8.4 km) tributary of the Monongahela River in Allegheny County, Pennsylvania. This urban stream drains portions of the communities of Pittsburgh, Baldwin, Brentwood, West Mifflin and Whitehall, an area of about ten square miles.

== Colonial history ==
1751 Map depicting "Licking Creek", today known as Streets Run

Streets Run, previously referred to as Licking Creek, is depicted in A map of the most inhabited part of Virginia containing the whole province of Maryland with part of Pennsylvania, New Jersey and North Carolina, drawn by Joshua Fry and Peter Jefferson in 1751, and published by Thos. Jefferys, London, 1755. This landmark map, unusual in that it relied on firsthand surveys, is the first correct depiction of the Allegheny Mountains, complete with "The Great Road from the Yadkin River thro Virgionia to Philadelphia distant 455 Miles" - an accurate survey of what would come to be styled the Great Philadelphia Wagon Road.

== Mining history ==
James Hardin Hays began mining coal along Streets Run in 1828. Other coal mines in the watershed were run by the I.D. Risher and Daniel W Risher Companies, as well as the Harrison Gas Coal Company.

== Railroad history ==
The H.B. Hays and Brothers Coal Railroad ran along Streets Run to service the mine developed by J.H. Hays. It ended at Six Mile Ferry, on the Monongahela. The Pittsburgh Southern Railroad and its successor, the Baltimore and Ohio Railroad, also had lines running through the valley. The Whitehall Tunnel connects this valley with the Peters Creek watershed.

== See also ==
- List of rivers of Pennsylvania

== Additional images ==
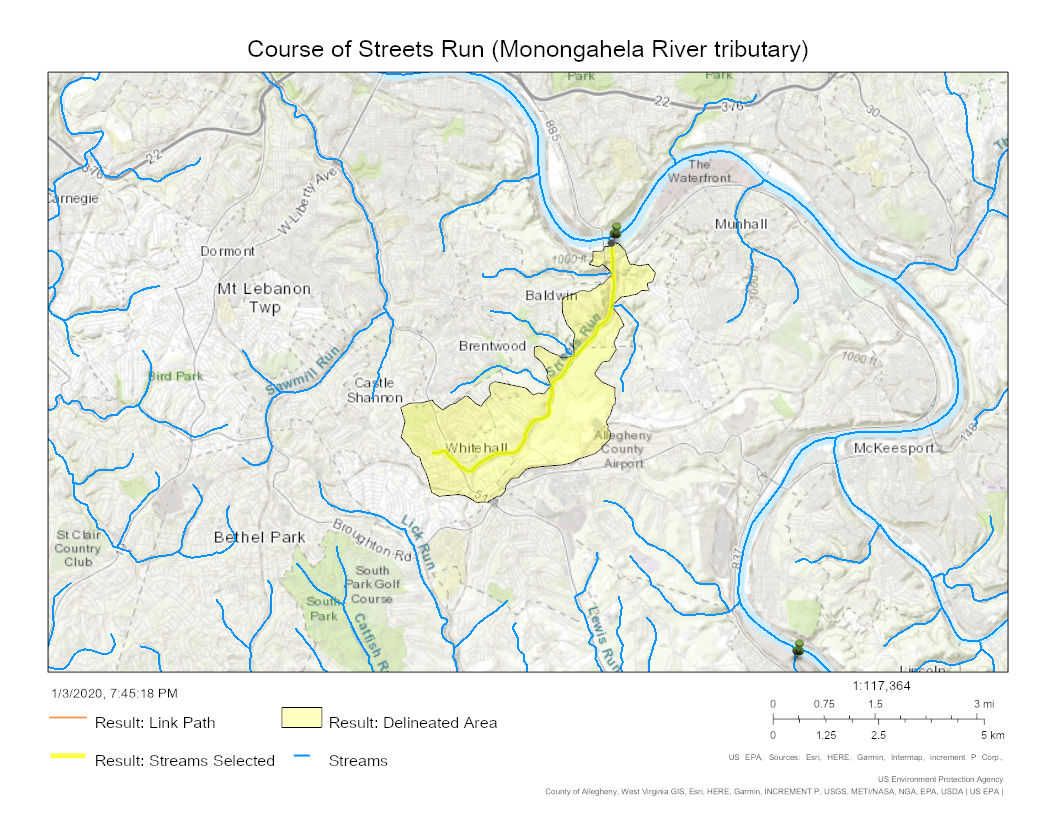
Course of Streets Run (Monongahala River tributary) in Allegheny County, Pennsylvania

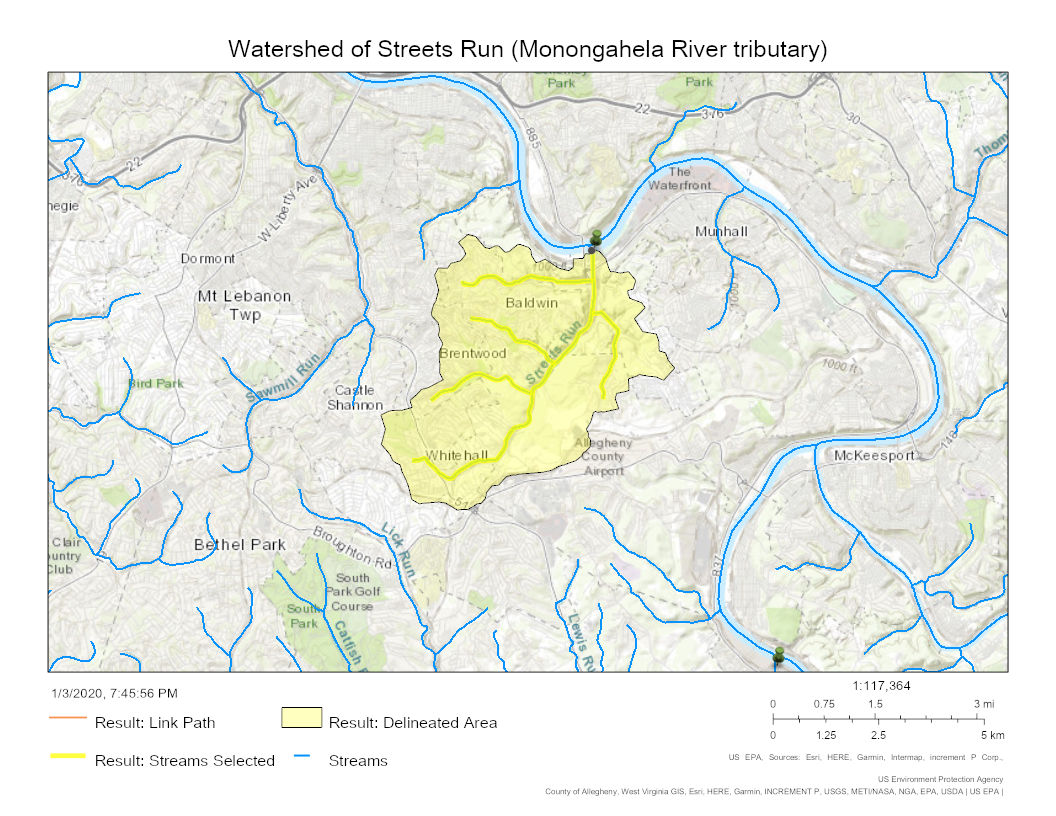
Watershed of Streets Run (Monongahela River tributary) in Allegheny County, Pennsylvania
