= Revenue Act of 1926 =

Act of the United States Congress

- Long title: An Act To reduce and equalize taxation, to provide revenue, and for other purposes.
- Enacted by: the 69th United States Congress

Citations
- Public law: Pub. L. 69–20
- Statutes at Large: 44 Stat. 9

Legislative history
- Introduced in the House as H.R. 1 on December 7, 1925; Passed the House on December 18, 1925 (390–25); Passed the Senate on February 12, 1926 (58–9); Reported by the joint conference committee on February 22, 1926; agreed to by the House on February 23, 1926 (354–28) and by the Senate on February 24, 1926 (61–10); Signed into law by President Calvin Coolidge on February 26, 1926

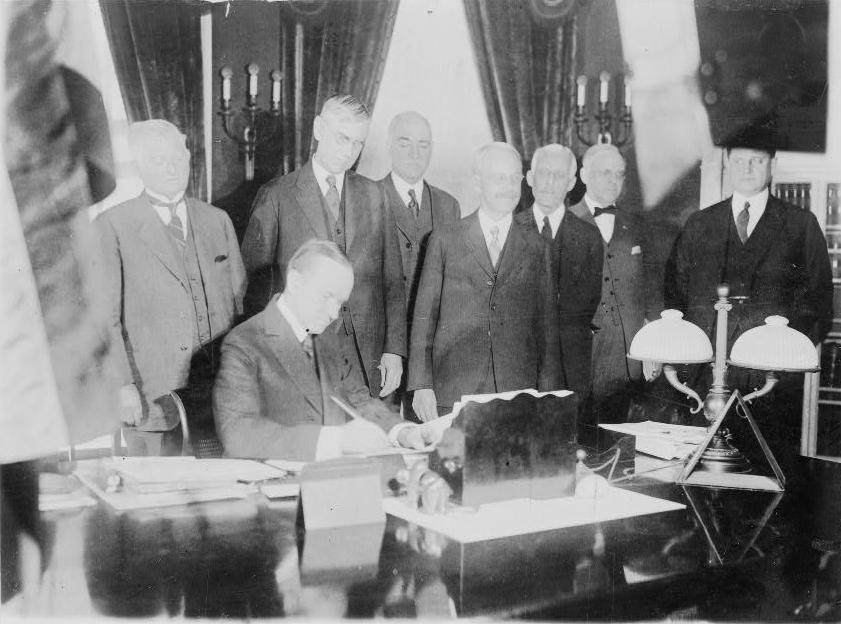
President Calvin Coolidge signed the income tax bill on February 26, 1926. Andrew Mellon is the third figure from the right, and Director of the Budget, General Herbert Mayhew Lord, is to Mellon's left.

The United States Revenue Act of 1926, 44 Stat. 9, reduced inheritance and personal income taxes, cancelled many excise imposts, eliminated the gift tax and ended public access to federal income tax returns.

The most notable parts of the Act were that maximum tax rates on inheritances and large estates were halved, as were income taxes for the wealthiest. As a consequence, taxes on the wealthy were greatly reduced. To garner political support for such massive tax cuts for the wealthy, the Act also provided small tax cuts across the board.

Passed by the 69th Congress, it was signed into law by President Calvin Coolidge.

The act was applicable to incomes for 1925 and thereafter.

== Tax on Corporations ==
A rate of 13.5 percent was levied on the net income of corporations.

== Tax on individuals ==
A normal tax and a surtax were levied against the net income of individuals as shown in the following table.

Revenue Act of 1926 Normal Tax and Surtax on Individuals
Net Income (dollars)	Normal Rate (percent)	Surtax Rate (percent)	Combined Rate (percent)
0	1.5	0	1.5
4,000	3	0	3
8,000	5	0	5
10,000	5	1	6
14,000	5	2	7
16,000	5	3	8
18,000	5	4	9
20,000	5	5	10
22,000	5	6	11
24,000	5	7	12
28,000	5	8	13
32,000	5	9	14
36,000	5	10	15
40,000	5	11	16
44,000	5	12	17
48,000	5	13	18
52,000	5	14	19
56,000	5	15	20
60,000	5	16	21
64,000	5	17	22
70,000	5	18	23
80,000	5	19	24
100,000	5	20	25

- Exemption of $1,500 for single filers and $3,500 for married couples and heads of family. A $400 exemption for each dependent under 18.
