= H.B. Hays and Brothers Coal Railroad =

Overview
- Locale: Allegheny County, Pennsylvania
- Successor: Pittsburgh Southern Railway

The H.B. Hays and Brothers Coal Railroad was a narrow gauge railroad opened in 1878 to carry coal from the Hays family mines along Becks Run and Streets Run in Allegheny County, Pennsylvania. Both branches included an incline, and both are visible in the engravings below, one just south of Six Mile Ferry, the other in the hills south of the mouth of Becks Run. The mines, railroads, and inclines were designed by Pittsburgh engineer John H. McRoberts.

== See also ==
- Henry Blake Hays
- List of funicular railways
- List of inclines in Pittsburgh
