= List of storms on the Great Lakes =

- Some of the deadliest Great Lakes storms
- 1860 Lady Elgin: over 400 dead
- 1835 "Cyclone": 254 dead
- 1913 Great Storm: 244 dead
- 1880 Alpena Storm: about 100 dead
- 1940 Armistice Day: 66 dead
- 1916 Black Friday: 49 dead
- 1958 Bradley: 33 dead
- 1905 Blow: 32 dead
- 1975 Fitzgerald: 29 dead
- 1966 Morrell: 28 dead
- 1894 May Gale: 27 dead

The Great Lakes are known for powerful storms resulting in significant loss of lives and vessels. The first recorded sailing vessel on the upper lakes, the Le Griffon, was lost on its return from Green Bay in 1679. Memorable storms across the lakes have been recorded since that time, often occurring in the month of November, taking men and ships to their death. With the advent of modern technology and sturdier vessels, fewer such losses have occurred. Wind across the large expanse of the lakes allows waves to build to substantial heights (fetches), and the open water can alter weather systems (fog, lake effect snow). Storm winds can alter the lakes as well with large systems causing storm surges that lower lake levels several feet on one side while raising it even higher on the other. The shallowest lake, Lake Erie, sometimes sees storm surge rises of 8 or 10 feet. Seiches cause short-term irregular lake level changes, killing people swept off beaches and piers and even sometimes sinking boats The great tolls caused by Great Lakes storms in 1868 and 1869 were one of the main reasons behind establishing a national weather forecasting service, initially run by the U.S. Army Signal Corps using telegraphs to announce approaching storms in a few port cities.

== Lake Erie Gale (1811) ==
In September 1811, Jacob Butler was headed to Sandusky, Ohio as the new Indian Agent. When he arrived in Buffalo, he found it to be a small town of 40-50 houses and little activity. There were but a few ships in the harbor. The Catherine was a new schooner that had set sail the day before, but was now anchored nine miles up the Canadian shore at Point Ebenew. As it had set sail, it encountered a west wind forcing it to seek shelter. Seeing an opportunity to avoid the long trip around the lake, he crossed the Niagara River and with the help of a guide came upon the ship at anchor after two hours. Soon they were underway with a steady breeze pushing them towards Sandusky.

The ship was packed and every possible space in which a person could find repose was occupied. All night they traveled westward, the ship pushed by the wind and the schooner rocking from side to side. With so many people, so closely packed, many became nauseated. The next day, they traveled westward. As night fell on their second day of travel, they expected to see Sandusky in the morning. Everyone had just settled down for the night, when a commotion arose and a gale blew out of the southwest, nearly tipping the vessel over. If the schooner had not been ‘hove to’ and resting quietly, it would have been capsized. (Without shore lights, lighthouse, or modern navigation equipment, Captains would ‘heave to’ at night if they anticipated approaching land/harbor soon. This prevented them from running aground in the dark.)

Quickly the crew made the Catherine ready for the storm and let her drift before the winds. As daylight came, the captain was able to get his ship behind Presque Isle (Erie, Pennsylvania), where they rode out the storm for the next 24 hours. The winds persisted so fiercely that everything on deck was swept clear. The crew and passengers remained below deck in the dark, their supply of food gone. On the fourth day of his journey, the gale ended and they were able to resupply from shore. Setting sail for Sandusky, the hope was to make harbor by dark. Once again a gale of lesser force sprang up and pushed the vessel back to Presque Isle. Here, many of the passengers left the ship and hired a wagon for the two-week overland trip. On their next attempt to reach Sandusky, the Catherine made harbor without incident.

== Storm in the age of canoes (1825) ==
It was September 1825 when Henry Rowe Schoolcraft recorded a late fall storm on Lake Huron. He was returning from an Indian ‘Congress’ at Prairie du Chien, Wisconsin. It had been an uneventful six-day trip from the Mississippi River to Michilimackinac. From Mackinac, Schoolcraft was headed towards Detour Pass and up the St. Mary's River to Sault Ste. Marie. On the morning of September 5, he arose, had breakfast and prepared to strike out in their canoes. The day was cloudy and threatening, so he decided to wait until the next day. Arising at three in the morning, he found the island lost in a fog. They waited until it began to clear at 6:30 a.m. and made their way to Goose Island, ten miles (16 km) distance after three hours. From there, they made their way to Outard Point. Here, the headwind had increased so they hove to about noon and were able to pull into an inlet out of the wind and make camp. Eight hours later, the canoe party was still waiting for the wind to let up. The night brought a heavy rain, piercing the fabric of the tents, soaking everyone and everything. The morning of the 7th found the storm continuing. The increasing violence caused Schoolcraft to have his tent moved back into the trees for more protection. Around three, the sky seemed to be brightening and expectations were that the weather was clearing. But the rains and the wind came with renewed fury from the west and continued late into the night. As the morning of the 8th arrived, Schoolcraft determined to get on with his journey. As the wind was directly out of the west, he was headed east, he ordered the canoes readied and the sails. With sails reefed against the storm, the brigade set out into the lake at 10:00 a.m. Just under three and a half hours brought them 20 miles to the Isle St. Vital, behind which they took refuge from the wind. After a break, they once again set into the gale-force winds, driving for De Tour and the St. Mary's Strait. Here they found the schooner Harriet, down bound, waiting for the winds to subside. It was but another day and they were once again at Sault Ste. Marie.

== Early steam on the Lakes (1835) ==
On November 11, 1835, a southwest wind swept across the lakes, taking numerous vessels. This was still early in the life of commercial shipping on the Lakes, so most of the losses were on the lower lakes where settlements were greatest.

Buffalo was a major port on Lake Erie and felt the force of the storm as water from the lake forced ships onto the piers and shoreline of the city. The creek rose 20 feet as the wind and the harbor front were swept away.

Ship	Port of origin	Lake	Location	Lives lost
Free Trader	Fort Burwell, Canada	Lake Erie	Off Dunkirk, New York	all hands but one
Comet	Madison	Lake Erie	near Fairport	all hands
North America		Lake Erie	beached at Erie, Pennsylvania	n/a
Sandusky	Buffalo, New York	Lake Erie	beached at Buffalo	n/a
Henry Clay	Buffalo	Lake Erie	beached at Buffalo	n/a
Sheldon Thompson	Buffalo	Lake Erie	beached at Buffalo	n/a
Two Brothers (sch)	Buffalo	Lake Erie	beached at Buffalo	n/a
Tecumseh (sch)	Buffalo	Lake Erie	beached at Buffalo	n/a
Col. Benton (sch)	Buffalo	Lake Erie	beached at Buffalo	n/a
Godolphin (sch)		Lake Erie	beached at Fairport	n/a
Lagrange (sch)	Buffalo	Lake Erie	capsized at Point Pelee	all hands but two (clinging to mast)
Robert Bruce	Kingston, Ontario	Lake Ontario	near Henderson Point	all hands
Medora	Oswego, New York	Lake Ontario		all hands
Chance (sch)		Lake Michigan		7 lost
Bridget (sch)		Lake Michigan	near St. Joseph, Michigan	16 lost
Sloan (sch)		Lake Michigan		6 lost
Delaware (sch)		Lake Michigan		

== Big Blow of 1880 ==
- PS Alpena sank with loss of 80 passengers and crew.

== The 1905 Blow (1905) ==
The Mataafa Storm of 1905 is the name of a storm that occurred on the Great Lakes on November 27–28, 1905. The system moved across the Great Basin with moderate depth on November 26 and 27, then east-northeastward across the Great Lakes on November 28. Fresh east winds were forecast for the Great Lakes for the afternoon and evening of November 27, with storm warnings were in effect by the morning of November 28. Storm-force winds and heavy snows accompanied the cyclone's passage. The storm, named after the Mataafa wreck, ended up destroying or damaging about 29 vessels, killing 36 seamen and causing shipping losses of $3.567 million (1905 dollars) on Lake Superior.

=== The Wrecks of November 28 ===
Ship	Shipping Line	Refuge/Wreck Site	Damage
Isaac Ellwood (stmr)	Pittsburgh Steamship	Duluth	aground
Mataafa (stmr)	Pittsburgh Steamship	Duluth	aground
R.W. England (stmr)	Tomlinson	Duluth	
Crescent City (stmr)	Pittsburgh Steamship	Lakewood (7 m NE of Duluth)	aground against cliffs
Lafayette (stmr)	Pittsburgh Steamship	Encampment Island (7 m NE of Two Harbors, Minnesota)	‘broken up’
Manila (barge of Lafayette)	Pittsburgh Steamship	Encampment Island (7 m NE of Two Harbors)	aground
William Edenborn	Pittsburgh Steamship	nr Split Rock River	hard ashore & broken in two
Madeira (barge of Edenborn)	Pittsburgh Steamship	Gold Rock (3 mi NE)	sunk and broken in two
George Herbert (scow)		Two Island, nr Schroeder, Minnesota	smashed to pieces
George Spencer (stmr-wooden)		Thomasville (nr Tofte, Minnesota)	hard aground
Amboy (barge of Spencer)			hard aground
Monkshaven (stmr)		Pie Island, Port Arthur, Ontario	on the rocks
William E. Corey (stmr)	Pittsburgh Steamship	Gull Island (Apostles)	stranded
Western Star (stmr)		Fourteen-Mile Point nr Ontonagon, Michigan	stranded tight
Coralia (stmr)	Pittsburgh Steamship	Point Isabelle (east side Keweenaw Peninsula)	‘hung-up’
Maia (barge of Coralia)	Pittsburgh Steamship	Point Isabelle (east side Keweenaw Peninsula)	‘hung-up’
Ira Owen (stmr)		NE of Outer Island (Apostles)	foundered
Percy G. Walker (stmr)		Two Harbors	Badly damaged deck house
Vega (stmr)	Gilchrist Transportation Co.	South or North? side of Fox Island	'broke in two and pounded to pieces'

== The Big Storm (1913) ==
In 1913, from the ninth of November through the twelfth, all five lakes were turned into cauldrons of rolling water by a unique combination of weather patterns. Before the four days ended, 13 ships went under and many more were driven ashore. Two hundred forty-four men died. The largest loss of ships was on Lake Huron (see Shipwrecks of Lake Huron)

Ship	Type of Vessel	Lake	Location	Lives lost
Argus	Steamer	Lake Huron	near Point Aux Barques, Michigan	all 25 lost
James Carruthers	Steamer	Lake Huron	near Kincardine	all 22 lost
Hydrus	Steamer	Lake Huron	near Lexington, Michigan	all 25 lost
Leafield	Steamer	Lake Superior	near Angus Island	all 18 lost
John A. McGean	Steamer	Lake Huron	near Port Hope, Michigan	all 28 lost
Plymouth	Barge	Lake Michigan	near Gull Island	all 7 lost
Charles S. Price	Steamer	Lake Huron	near Port Huron, Michigan	all 28 lost
Regina	Steamer	Lake Huron	near Harbor Beach, Michigan	all 20 lost
Isaac M. Scott	Steamer	Lake Huron	near Northpoint, Michigan	all 28 lost
Henry B. Smith	Steamer	Lake Superior	near Marquette, Michigan	all 25 lost
Wexford	Steamer	Lake Huron	north of Grand Bend, Ontario	all hands ^{1}
Buffalo (LV-82)	Lightship	Lake Erie	Point Albino (near Buffalo)	all 6 lost

^{1} (actual number of lives lost on Wexford uncertain) 17 to 24 victims reported

== Black Friday (1916) ==
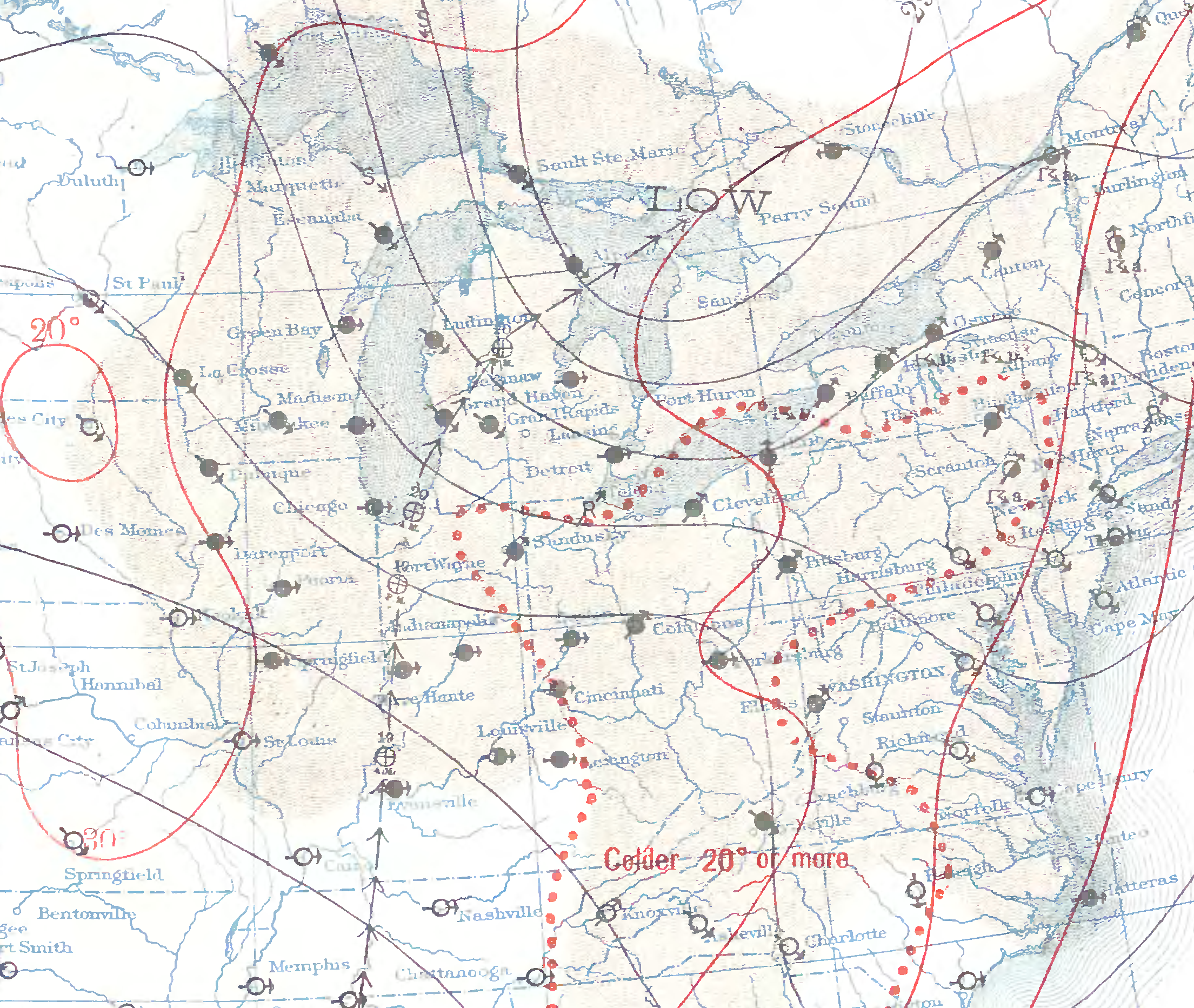
The surface map from Saturday, October 21, 1916, with the track of 1916 Atlantic hurricane 14.

Friday, October 20, 1916, on Lake Erie. These were the years before there was ship to shore radio. Once out on the lakes, each ship had only itself to depend upon and the chance of meeting another ship. While only four ships were lost, nearly all the men of these crews were lost to the tempest of the storm-tossed lake. In all, Black Friday took the lives of 49 men.

The James B. Colgate had just finished loading coal and set sail from Buffalo, New York bound for Fort William, Ontario (now Thunder Bay). It was 1:10 in the morning as the Colgate dropped its hawsers and headed out into the open lake. Dawn found the Colgate off Long Point. All day they moved steadily westward, keeping the bow into the wind, waves crashing over the decks and beating on the hatch coverings. Slowing, water began to enter the cargo holds. The pumps could not keep up with the influx of water and she began to list at about eight o'clock that evening. No other ships had been seen and none could be found. The bow was riding low in the water. As the ten o'clock hour came around, the Colgate slid beneath the waves. The men all had life jackets, but nothing was floating which would help them get out of the cold water. One life raft was found and a coal passer, the engineer and the captain took refuge. In the middle of the night, the raft was flipped and the coal passer did not return. As the 21st dawned, the raft again spilled its occupants and the engineer returned but was too weak to hold on and he was lost. Night came on and Captain Walter J. Grashaw still hung on to the raft. A passenger steamer passed nearby, but he was unnoticed in the dark. As daylight dawned on the 22nd, Sunday, the Marquette & Bessemer No. 2 (II) came to his rescue.

Marshall F. Butters, a wooden lumber carrier down bound to Cleveland with a cargo of shingles and lumber, entered Lake Erie from the Detroit River. The wind rose and the waves grew in height. The Butters turned into Lake Erie heading towards the Southeast Shoals Light, off the tip of Point Pelee. The wooden ship could not take the pounding of the waves. Settling into the lake, soon the boilers were extinguished and the Butters was at the mercy of the storm. Ten men set sail in the lifeboat, leaving only the captain and two men on board the sinking vessel. The Pioneer Steamship Company's Frank R. Billings and the F.G. Hartwell were nearby. The Billings approached to give aid. Pouring storm oil on the water, they were able to calm the seas enough to rescue Captain McClure and his two men. Meanwhile, the Hartwell rescued the men in the lifeboat.

A third ship the D.L. Filer, a wooden schooner of 45 years, was headed from Buffalo to Saugatuck, Michigan with a load of coal. For two days, the Filer beat into the wind headed for the Detroit River at the western end of Lake Erie. Just off Bar Point, within sight of the mouth of the Detroit River, the pumps could no longer move the volume of water rushing into the holds, and the seams began to open. In eighteen feet of water, she settled to the bottom. Six men climbed the foremast, while the captain climbed the after mast. It looked like all seven of the crew could cling to the mast and weather the night. But the weight of six men snapped the fore mast and five disappeared. Only one man made it to the after mast and climbed to safety. As dawn broke the horizon, the Western States came into sight and turned towards the two men clinging to the mast protruding from the shallows. As the steamer approached, one man slipped from the mast and was never seen again. Only the Captain John Mattison was rescued.

Meanwhile, the Canadian steamer Merida disappeared that night. All 23 of her crew were found the next day floating in mid-lake, only identified by their life vests bearing the name Merida.

== Armistice Day blizzard (1940) ==
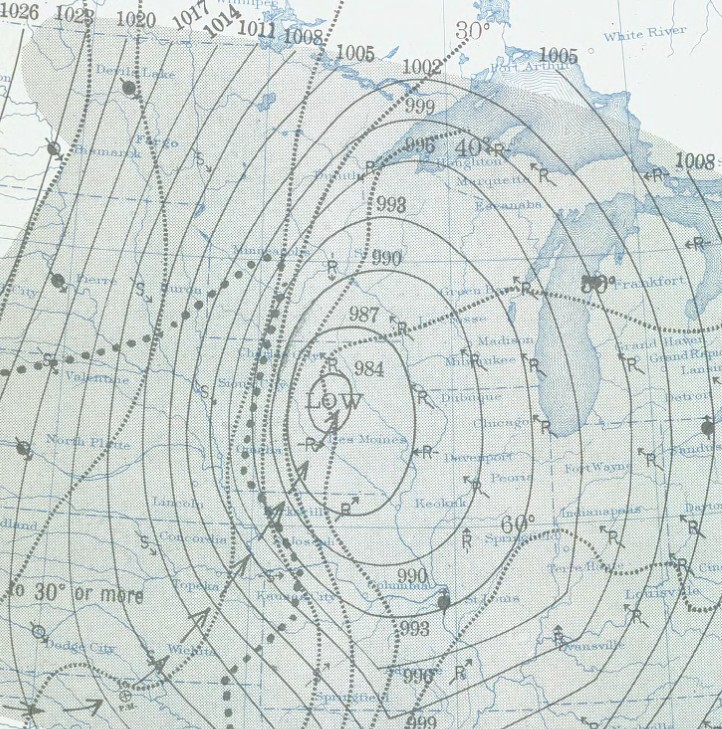
Armistice Day Blizzard surface map.

The Armistice Day Blizzard was a winter storm that occurred on November 11–12, 1940 which brought heavy snow and winds up to 80 mph. The lake freighter SS William B. Davock sank with all 33 hands in Lake Michigan south of Pentwater, Michigan. The SS Anna C. Minch foundered, broke in two and sank nearby with the loss of all 24 crew. A third ship, the SS Novadoc, wrecked on a reef in the same area. Two crew were lost and the rest were rescued two days later by the tug Three Brothers. Two smaller boats also sank, bringing the total death toll on the Lakes to 66.

== Duluth Storm (1967) ==
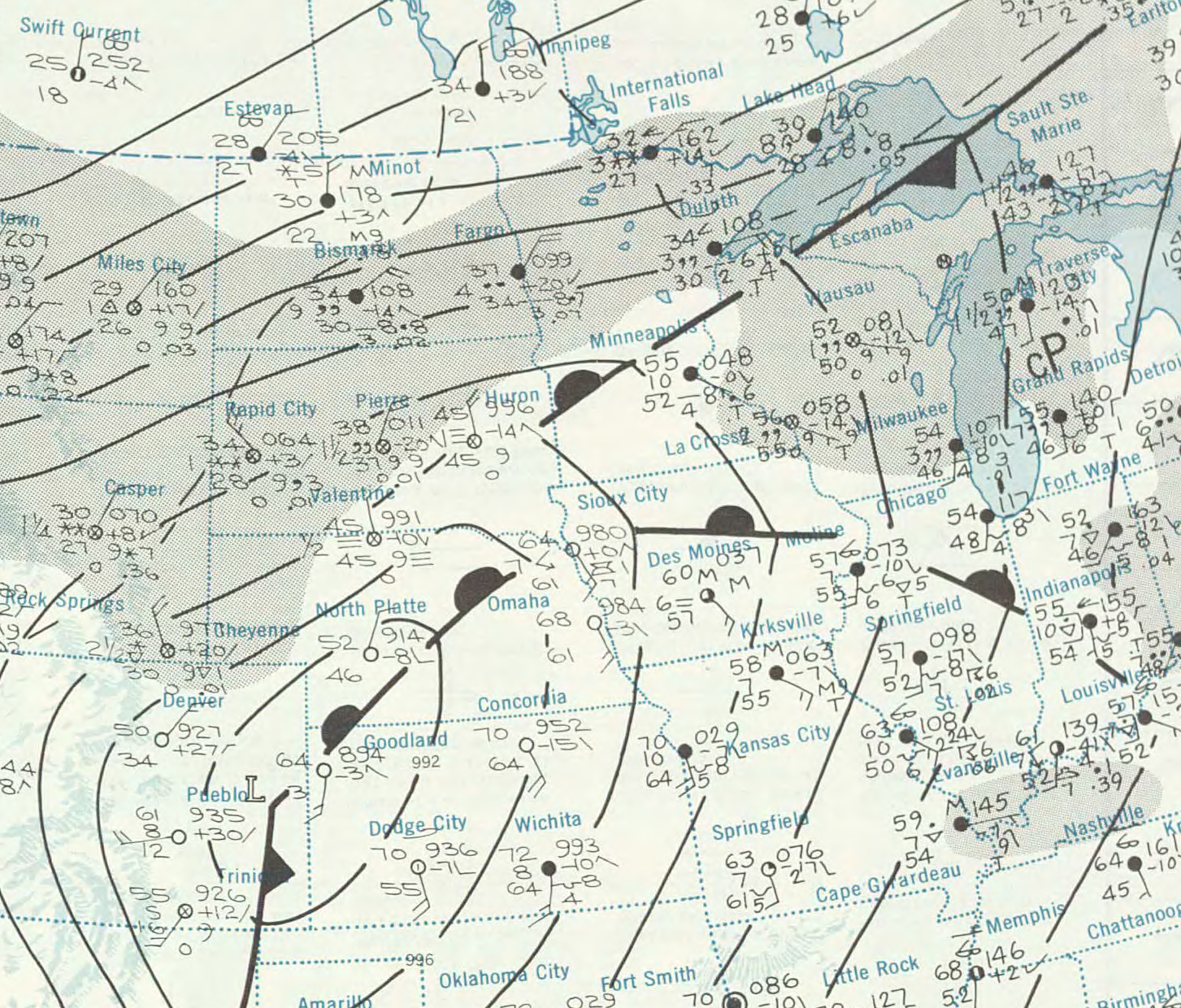
Surface map showing the situation at 1 AM EST, April 30, 1967.

On April 30, 1967, a storm in Duluth, Minnesota took the lives of three teenage boys and Coast Guardsman Edgar Culbertson. Culbertson and two others were part of a rescue team searching for the missing boys on the Duluth Entry pier on Lake Superior. Meteorologists and Minnesota residents often refer to this day as "Black Sunday". There were reports of heavy rain as far north as Duluth that day. The waves on Lake Superior in Duluth that night were reportedly over 20 feet (6.1 m) high at times; the lake had 36 °F (2 °C) water with gale-force winds gusting up to 45 miles per hour (72 km/h).

== Wreck of the Edmund Fitzgerald (1975) ==
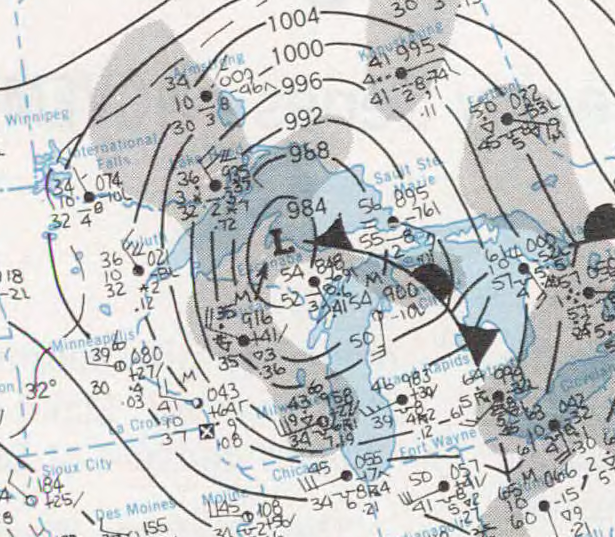
Surface map from November 10, 1975.

It was November 9, 1975, that Edmund Fitzgerald was downbound to Detroit with a load of taconite. Arthur M. Anderson joined her on Lake Superior and was downbound for Gary, Indiana. As they were crossing Lake Superior the winter storm blew in. Winds were reported in excess of 50 kn (58 mph; 93 km/h) with waves running up to 35 feet (11 m). The next day, Monday, November 10, eastern Lake Superior was still experiencing winds of 50 knots (57.5 mph). That afternoon Anderson reported being hit by a 75-knot gust (86.3 mph). By 3:30 pm the Fitzgerald reported a minor list and top-side damage, including the loss of radar. Fitzgerald was leading, but slowed to close the distance between ships so that it could be guided by Anderson, who still had radar. Just after seven that night, the last radio contact from the Fitzgerald said that they were still managing. By 7:20 p.m. there was no more contact and Anderson no longer saw Fitzgerald on radar.

Fitzgerald sank in Canadian waters 530 feet (160 m) deep, approximately 17 miles (15 nautical miles; 27 kilometers) from the entrance to Whitefish Bay near the twin cities of Sault Ste. Marie, Michigan, and Sault Ste. Marie, Ontario. Although Fitzgerald had reported being in difficulty earlier, no distress signals were sent before she sank. Her crew of 29 all perished, and no bodies were recovered.

Many theories, books, studies and expeditions have examined the cause of the sinking. Fitzgerald may have fallen victim to a huge wave, suffered structural failure, been swamped with water entering through her cargo hatches or deck, experienced topside damage, or shoaled in a shallow part of Lake Superior. The sinking of Edmund Fitzgerald is one of the best-known disasters in the history of Great Lakes shipping. Gordon Lightfoot made it the subject of his 1976 hit song "The Wreck of the Edmund Fitzgerald".

== The Lake Huron Cyclone (1996) ==
The 1996 Lake Huron cyclone was a unique storm for the Great Lakes, acquiring some tropical characteristics at its peak intensity.

== Northeastern Ontario Derecho (2006) ==
The 2006 Northeastern Ontario Derecho formed on the Great Lakes. The Storm caused damage throughout Northern Ontario, and into Quebec.

== The "Chiclone" (2010) ==
On October 26, 2010, the USA recorded its lowest pressure ever in a continental, non-hurricane system, though its pressure was consistent with a category three hurricane. The powerful system was dubbed the "Chiclone" by the media as it hit the Chicago area particularly strongly, as well as Minnesota, Wisconsin and Michigan. It was also meteorologically referred to as a bombogenesis due to the rapid drop of barometric pressure experienced.

In Superior, Wisconsin, the storm managed a 28.38 inch reading—a new all-time low for Wisconsin at the time. Near International Falls on the U.S./Canada border, the system's 28.23 inches of mercury (956 mb) reading established a new all-time Minnesota low pressure. Early Tuesday morning October 26, an F2 tornado rushed through Will County, south of Chicago, at 7:00 AM. Another tornado is said to have struck Racine, Wisconsin, to the north, but has not yet been confirmed. In Roscoe, IL, about 100 miles to the west of Chicago and 15 minutes north of Rockford, a woman was killed after being crushed under a large tree that fell in her neighborhood of Chicory Ridge.

The storm also produced some of the highest officially recorded waves by weather buoys stationed in Lakes Superior and Michigan. Specifically, on Wednesday, October 27, 2010, buoy no. 45136, operated by Environment Canada, in northern Lake Superior recorded a significant wave height of 26.6 feet (this is average height of 1/3 of the highest waves over an hour), and buoy no. 45002, operated by the National Data Buoy Center (NDBC), recorded a significant wave height of 21.7 feet in northern Lake Michigan. This would appear consistent with the NOAA forecast for northern Lake Michigan calling for 21–26-foot waves that day. The persistence and strength of the storm's westerly winds also piled the waters of Lake Michigan along the Michigan shoreline leading to declines in lake levels on the Illinois and Wisconsin side of the lake. Based on NOAA lake level sensors, an updated analysis of Wednesday, October 27, 2010, water levels on Lake Michigan revealed a two-day decrease of 42 inches at Green Bay, WI and 19 inches at Calumet Harbor, IL---while NOAA sensors at Ludington, MI and Mackinaw City, MI measured lake level rises of 7 and 19 inches respectively.

A 78 mph gust was recorded the afternoon of October 27, 2010, at the Harrison-Dever Crib, three miles offshore of Chicago in Lake Michigan, with gusts reaching 63 mph at Chicago's Latin School and in Racine, Wisconsin, 61 mph at Buffalo Grove, Waukegan, Gary and Monroe, Wisconsin and 58 mph at Hinsdale. The storm further whitened sections of the Upper Midwest with the region's first significant snow Tuesday night and Wednesday. Snowfall reports from Minnesota and North Dakota indicate 9 inches fell at Twig, Minn.; 8.5 inches at Dunn Center, N.D.; 8 inches at Adolph, Minn. and Carrington, N.D.; 7.7 inches at Duluth; 4.1 inches Williston; 4 inches at Minot and 3.4 inches at Bismarck---all in North Dakota.

== Superstorm Sandy (2012) ==
The cold front that merged with Hurricane Sandy at the end of October 2012 fueled Sandy's transition into a powerful extratropical cyclone, which brought strong winds and high waves across the Great Lakes. Lake Michigan recorded wave heights of 20 to 22 feet and wind gusts of 60 to 70 mph. The southern end of Lake Michigan experienced a lake level rise of 15 inches as the winds pushed water down the lake. Lake Huron experienced 23-foot waves and a wind gust of 74 mph was recorded at Fort Gratiot at the southern end of the lake. Most freighters stayed in harbor instead of trying to run through the storm.

== The Lake Michigan Storm of Halloween 2014 ==
On October 31, 2014, there was a powerful storm which impacted the Great Lakes area during times when people are traditionally celebrating Halloween.

== See also ==
- Great Lakes Storm of 1913
- List of victims of the 1913 Great Lakes storm
- SS Carl D. Bradley
- SS Daniel J. Morrell
- SS Henry Steinbrenner
- Upper Great Lakes severe weather outbreak of August 23, 1998
