= SS Argus =

Several merchant steamships have been named SS Argus, including:

- SS Argus (1898), later Vandoc, lake freighter, scrapped in 1966.
- SS Argus (1903), lake freighter, sank in 1913.
