= Oil and Water =

Oil and Water may refer to:

- A mixture of oil and water; see multiphasic liquid, oil spill, and storm oil
- "Oil and Water" (song), 2007 song by Incubus
- "Oil & Water", 2018 song by Boy George and Culture Club from the album Life
- "Oil and Water", a 2014 song by Lights from the album Little Machines
- Oil & Water EP, 2003 EP by Evermore
- Oil & Water, a 2016 album by Lee DeWyze
- Oil and Water (1913 film), American silent film
- "Oil & Water" (NCIS), 2013 TV episode
