= Scudding =

Scudding is a sailing maneuver which is used to weather heavy seas.

== Description ==
In scudding, the ship sails in front of the seas approaching from almost astern. In the past, sailing ships sometimes attempted to run before the seas approaching from astern with pressed sails or alternatively "top and tackle" or "under bare poles" (without sails set). To aid steerage, a sea anchor was often dragged behind or lines were put out at the stern. The force of the impacting water was also often reduced by releasing storm oil at the stern. Steam and motor ships scud with motors set at a low forward speed in order to maintain steerage.

== Advantages and disadvantages ==
Because the ship makes some headway through the water when scudding, the waves have a lower impact and a shorter contact period than when sailing against the sea. The wake provides additional protection when scudding and, in the case of engine-powered ships, so does the propeller wash. However, the maneuver carries several dangers, which from a modern perspective make it one of the most dangerous maneuvers in heavy seas. For one thing, ships often tend to yaw under slightly sideways following seas, in which case the ship can swing sideways; in addition, when the waves hit the ship at a resonant frequency of the ship's rolling period, this can cause instability; furthermore, a deterioration in the weather may be recognized too late due to the calmer perception of the seas. Smaller ships in particular, or ships with low stability, ships with low freeboard, or cargo that can slip, are at risk. Sea areas in which waves are steeper than normal are particularly dangerous when scudding.
