= Upper Great Lakes severe weather outbreak of August 23, 1998 =

Weather event in the United States

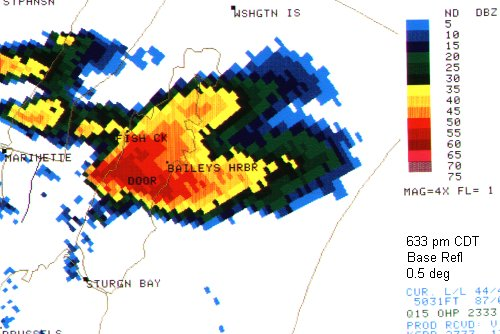
- Doppler Radar Image of the tornadic Door County supercell.

Meteorological history
- Date: August 23, 1998

Tornado outbreak
- Tornadoes: 3
- Max. rating: F3 tornado
- Duration: ~3 hours 13 minutes

Overall effects
- Casualties: 1 fatality, 2 injuries
- Damage: ~$11.52 million (1998 USD)

On August 23, 1998, a severe weather outbreak affected parts of Wisconsin and the Upper Peninsula of Michigan, causing millions of dollars in damage to the region. One fatality was attributed to this severe weather event when a severe thunderstorm knocked a tree onto a camper, killing its sole occupant. A supercell spawned an F3 tornado that ripped across Door County, causing $6.5 million in damages. It was the 8th costliest tornado in Wisconsin history, injuring two people, destroying multiple structures, and disrupting the regional economy and tourism. Two storms moved through the Fox Valley, producing a minimal F0 tornado, but devastating amounts of hail. Damages from the hail were estimated to be around $5 million and damaged many structures and vehicles. Wisconsin Governor Tommy Thompson requested a Presidential Disaster Declaration from President Bill Clinton for the disaster, but was denied.

== Meteorological synopsis ==
During the late morning on August 23, 1998, a well-defined short-wave trough was pushing across the Upper Peninsula of Michigan, and in response to this feature a group of severe storms formed across the region. One of the severe storm's high winds toppled a pine tree onto a camper at Ottawa National Forest killing its sole occupant. At 11:00 am CDT (16:00 UTC) a boundary was starting to develop across northern Wisconsin, however it was not yet evident in a surface analysis. The origins of this boundary are unknown but it is speculated that it was the remnants of a warm front that pushed into Wisconsin the day before. It is also noted that the boundary may have developed from a thunderstorm complex over Michigan. The boundary soon strengthened by rain cooled air from Michigan. By 1:00 pm CDT (18:00 UTC) a relatively weak low pressure trough had moved over much of the Upper Midwest. Around this time the strengthening boundary showed features of an outflow boundary separating rain-cooled air to the north from warm, unstable air to the south. Another well-defined outflow boundary had developed over Northern Michigan and began moving east. When the new boundary intersected the older one, a thunderstorm developed near Iron Mountain, Michigan. This interaction began to drive the original boundary farther South into Wisconsin.

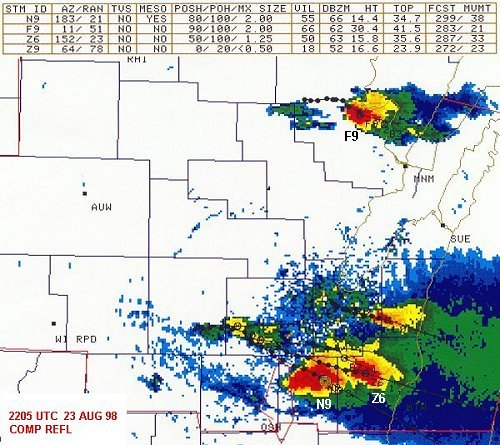
Radar image of the severe thunderstorms moving over Wisconsin and Michigan at 5:05 CDT (22:05 UTC).

At around 1:30 pm CDT (18:30 UTC) the atmospheric conditions over Central Wisconsin continued to deteriorate as the CAPE in the region approached 4300 J/kg. Average Temperatures in the region had increased to around 80 °F (27 °C) and dew points had risen as well. By 1:45 pm CDT (18:45 UTC) cumulus clouds over Central Wisconsin were showing substantial vertical development, and not soon after thunderstorms began forming rapidly across Wisconsin, quickly developing supercell characteristics. At 2:57 pm CDT (19:57 UTC) a Severe Thunderstorm Warning was issued for one of the developing storms, and at the same time a WSR-88D Doppler radar in Green Bay had detected a mesocyclone with the growing storm.

By 4:00 pm CDT (21:00 UTC), the Green Bay radar was picking up two well-developed supercells heading towards the Fox Cities. At the same time, a mesoscale boundary began developing over Northeast Wisconsin. The new development happened at the intersections of Forest, Marinette, and Oconto Counties, eventually growing into the Door County supercell. The two Fox City storms caused devastating hail and wind damage, especially to Appleton. A brief tornado touched down with the Fox Cities storm system near Menasha. The northern cell continued to develop during this time, but at a much slower rate than the southern storms. This was likely because the mesoscale convergence along the boundary had failed to break the cap.

Just before 5:00 pm CDT (22:00 UTC) the vertically integrated liquid (VIL) of the northern storm rapidly exceeded those of the southern storms, and it suddenly made an abrupt right turn. This prompted a Severe Thunderstorm Warning to be issued for Marinette County. By 5:30 pm CDT (22:30 UTC) the southern storms had weakened to a point where they were no longer a major severe threat. The northern storm however continued to intensify, and began to develop a moderate mid level rotation.

By 5:45 pm CDT (22:45 UTC), a well-defined hook had developed in the southwestern portion of the storm, prompting a Tornado Warning to be issued for Menominee County in Michigan. A report of a funnel cloud was made while the storm was near Birch Creek, approximately 5 miles (8.0 km) north of Menominee, Michigan. At 6:10 pm CDT (23:10 UTC) a waterspout was confirmed to have touched down in Green Bay. The waterspout likely remained on the water for nearly 20 minutes. At 6:30 pm CDT (23:30 UTC), the waterspout moved onshore at Murphy County Park along Horseshoe Bay in Door County. The tornado continued to move inland flattening thousands of trees in a heavily wooded area. The tornado tore across the Door Peninsula making it almost two thirds of the way across before dissipating. Its damage was determined to have peaked at F3 strength. At 7:00 pm CDT (00:00 UTC), the storm moved over Lake Michigan and eventually dissipated.

At 7:35 pm CDT (00:35 UTC), another storm crossed over central Wisconsin, producing an F0 tornado near Maple, destroying a mobile home before lifting.

== Confirmed tornadoes ==
Confirmed tornadoes by Fujita rating
FU	F0	F1	F2	F3	F4	F5	Total
0	2	0	0	1	0	0	3

=== August 23 event ===
List of confirmed tornadoes – Sunday, August 23, 1998 (Note: All dates are based on the local time zone where the tornado touched down; however, all times are in Coordinated Universal Time for consistency.)
F#	Location	County / parish	State	Start coord.	Time (UTC)	Path length	Max. width
F0	Menasha	Winnebago	WI	44.2°N 88.45°W	21:22	0.1 mi (0.16 km)	10 yd (9.1 m)
F0	A brief tornado was confirmed; no damage information was provided.						
F3	S of Egg Harbor	Door	WI	45.02°N 87.33°W	23:30–23:44	5.1 mi (8.2 km)	1,300 yd (1,200 m)
F3	See section for this tornado – Two people were injured.						
F0	Maple	Douglas	WI	46.58°N 91.72°W	00:35	0.1 mi (0.16 km)	25 yd (23 m)
F0	Douglas County Sheriff's deputies tracked a funnel cloud that briefly touched down near Maple. An unanchored older model mobile home was tipped over, with the east half of its roof torn off and wrapped around a tree 150 yd (140 m) away. A garage nearby was also destroyed.						

=== Door County, Wisconsin ===
Door County, Wisconsin
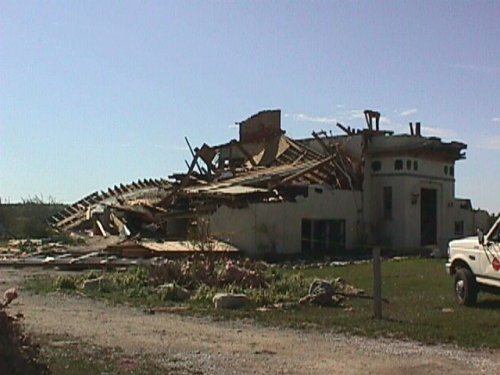
- Tornado damage to a structure off of WIS 42.

Meteorological history
- Formed: August 23, 1998, 6:30 p.m. CDT (UTC–05:00)
- Dissipated: August 23, 1998, 6:44 p.m. CDT (UTC–05:00)
- Duration: 14 minutes

F3 tornado
- on the Fujita scale

Overall effects
- Fatalities: 0
- Injuries: 2

As of 2005, the Door County tornado was the 8th costliest tornado in Wisconsin history, causing an estimated $6.5 million in damages. The tornado first touched down as a waterspout, but moved onshore in Door County, causing significant property and crop damage. Murphy County Park was the first place on land to be impacted by the tornado. The southern part of the park received the most substantial damage with 99%+ of all trees and shrubs in the area being uprooted or destroyed. As the tornado moved across the peninsula it caused F2 and F3 damage to structures.

It traveled across the land for about 5 miles (8.0 km), which took it 14 minutes. In total 20 residential buildings, two businesses and multiple barns were destroyed by the tornado. A campground known as the Door County Kamping Resort saw some of the tornado's worst impacts. 40 campers hid in a brick shower building while the F3 tornado moved over the camp, where only two injuries were reported. A nearby hotel and antique shop known as Cornerstone Suites were also completely destroyed by the tornado.

Although there were very few injuries from the tornado, the storm knocked out power to most of the peninsula. Due to the lack of power, most tourist attractions in the area were not able to provide for their customers. Chief deputy Gary Bies of the Door County Sheriff's Department said of the event, "People are sitting in motels with nothing to do. No restaurants; everything is closed." By late August 24, most power was returned to the area.

== Impact ==
=== Fox Valley supercells ===
Effects from the Fox Valley storms did not cause any injuries, but caused $5 million in damages, mostly to vehicles and buildings. It was the second multimillion-dollar hailstorm to occur that year in Appleton. In Sherwood a golf course was severely damaged and could not reopen until two days later. A church was also significantly damaged in the village of Brillion.

== Aftermath ==
Following the devastating storms Wisconsin Governor Tommy Thompson requested a Presidential Disaster Declaration from President Bill Clinton. The request put in by the governor was declined. The State of Wisconsin and its citizens ended up funding most of the disaster relief for the event. A local bank also established a relief fund for victims of the Door County tornado. The aid went to the American Red Cross.

== See also ==
- List of North American tornadoes and tornado outbreaks
- Tornadoes of 1998
- List of storms on the Great Lakes
