= PS Alpena =

American steamship

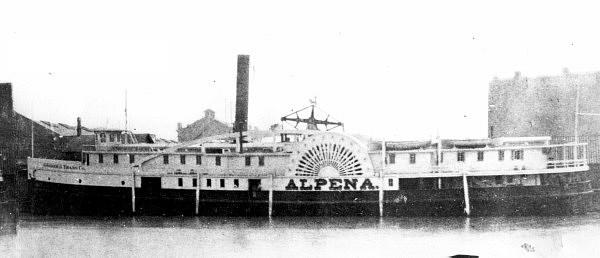

History
- Name: Alpena
- Owner: The Goodrich Line
- Port of registry: United States
- Builder: Thomas Arnold of Gallagher & Company at Marine City, Michigan
- Completed: 1866
- Acquired: Purchased from Gardner, Ward & Gallagher in April, 1868.
- Refit: Completely overhauled at Manitowoc, Wisconsin in the winter of 1875-1876
- Fate: Sunk in Lake Michigan, near Wisconsin during the "Big Blow" storm of 15 October 1880.

General characteristics
- Class & type: Paddlewheel steamship
- Tonnage: 654 tons
- Length: 197 ft (60 m)
- Beam: 26.66 ft (8.13 m)
- Depth: 12 ft (3.7 m)
- Installed power: a single cylinder vertical beam steam engine
- Propulsion: a pair of 24 ft (7.3 m) radius side wheels

PS Alpena was a sidewheel steamer built by Thomas Arnold of Gallagher & Company at Marine City, Michigan in 1866. She was operated by the Goodrich Line after being purchased from Gardner, Ward & Gallagher in April 1868. The Alpena sank in Lake Michigan in the "Big Blow" storm on October 15, 1880, with the loss of all on board.

== Construction ==
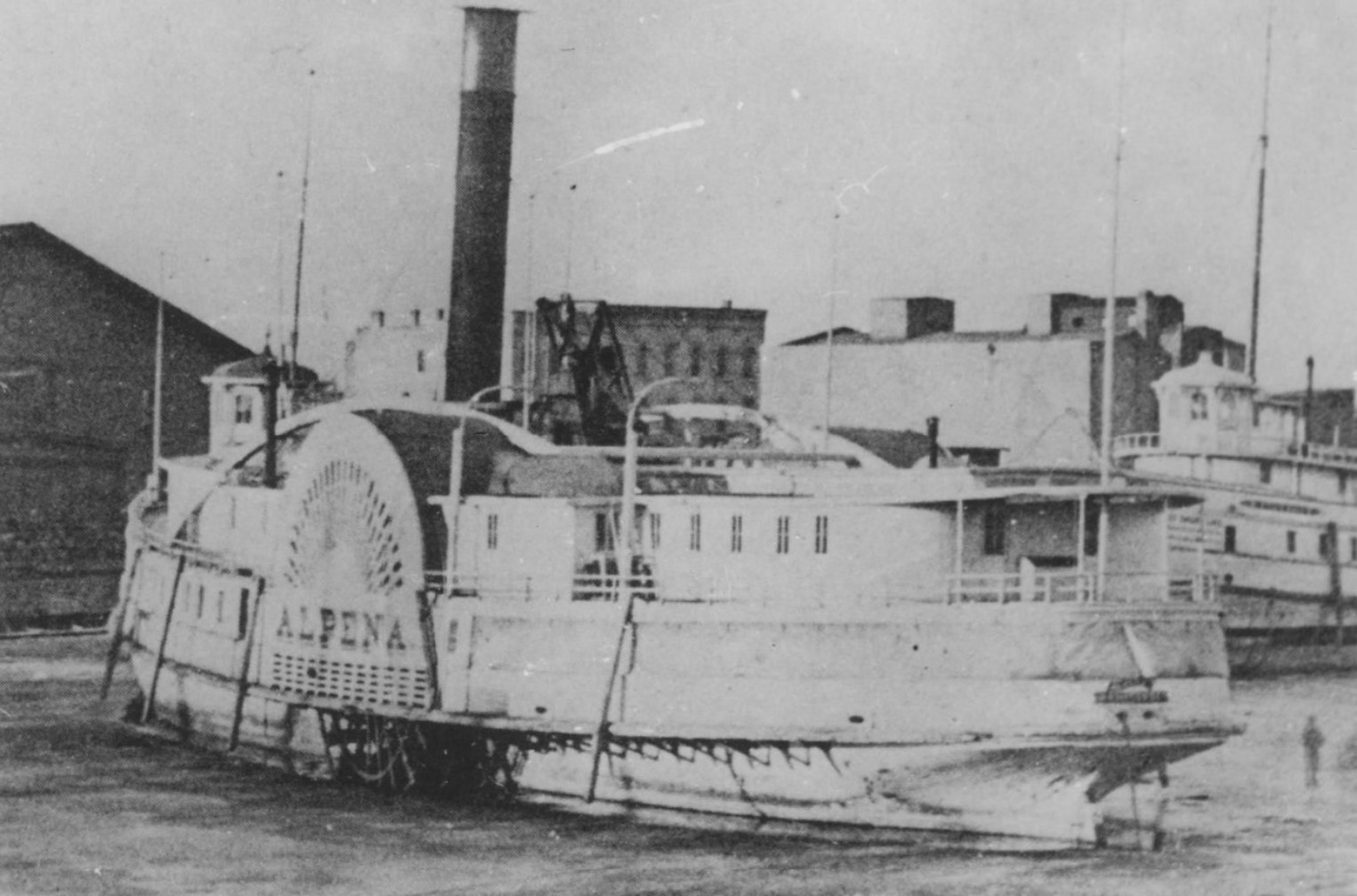
Stern view of the steamer Alpena

Built in 1866, by the Thomas Arnold of Gallagher & Company of Marine City, Michigan, the Alpena was 197 feet (60 m) in length, 27 feet (8.2 m) in breadth, with a depth of 12 feet (3.7 m). It was rated at 654 tons displacement. The vessel was driven by a steam engine, and photographs of the vessel show its walking beam suspended above the paddlewheels.

== Sinking ==
At least 60 people died when the ship, also carrying a large cargo of apples, capsized in the middle of the lake. The ship was on a trip from Grand Haven, Michigan, to Chicago, Illinois, and was spotted at 8:00 am on October 16 in heavy seas. Some time later, probably due to a shift in the cargo on deck caused by the waves, it capsized and drifted northwest. On the 17th, debris including a piano came ashore in Holland, Michigan, while apples and wood debris were found at Saugatuck. A section of beach near Holland where debris was found is still called Alpena Beach. The loss of life is estimated at 60-consisting of about 25 crew and about 35 passengers.

== See also ==
- List of maritime disasters in the 19th century
- List of storms on the Great Lakes
- Sea Wing disaster
- SS Eastland
