= SS John A. McGean =

Steamship on the North American Great Lakes in the early 20th century

Coordinates: 43.953267°N 82.528617°W

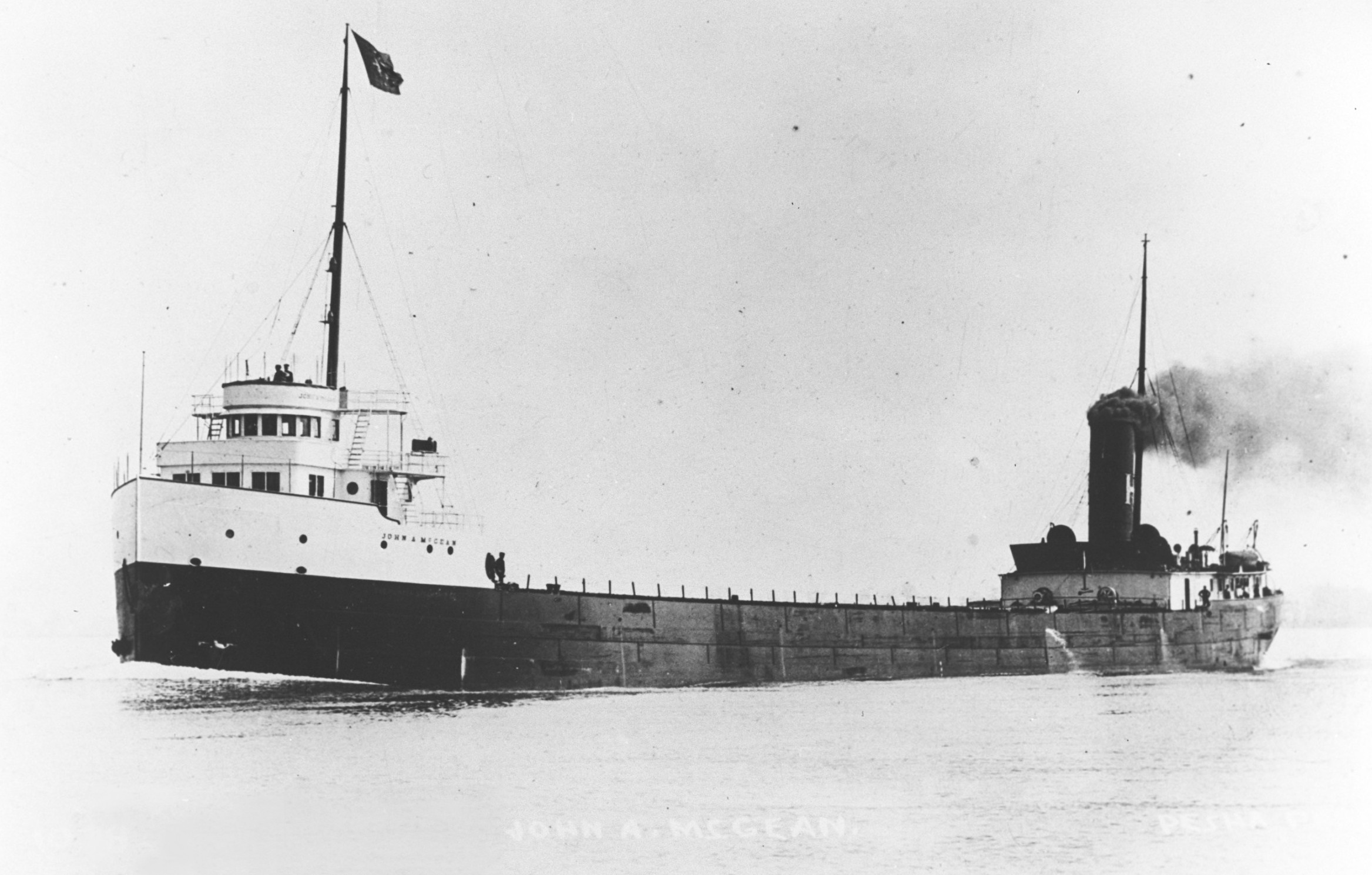
- The John A. McGean photographed by Louis J. Pesha, sometime prior to the 1913 storm.

History

United States
- Name: John A. McGean
- Owner: Hutchinson & Company
- Operator: Pioneer Steamship Company
- Ordered: 1907
- Builder: American Shipbuilding Co.
- Yard number: 359
- Completed: 1908
- In service: 1908
- Out of service: 1913
- Fate: Sunk in Great Lakes Storm of 1913

General characteristics
- Tonnage: 5,100 GRT
- Length: 432 ft (132 m)
- Beam: 52 ft (16 m)
- Draft: 28 ft (8.5 m)
- Propulsion: Two Scotch Marine boilers, one triple expansion steam engine and one propeller.
- Crew: 23
- Notes: Some sources cite 28 crew members

SS John A. McGean was an American freighter that operated on the Great Lakes. The ship was built in Lorain Ohio and owned by Hutchinson & Co. (operated by Pioneer Steamship Co.) from 1908 until her sinking in Lake Huron during the white hurricane of November 1913, with the loss of all 23-28 crew members.

== History ==
=== Construction and description ===
John A. McGean was laid down as yard number 359 in 1908 at the American Shipbuilding Company shipyard in Lorain, Ohio, and completed later that year. The ship was named after one of the directors at the shipyard. She was 432 feet (132 m) long, with a beam of 52 feet (16 m) and a draft of 28 feet (8.5 m), and measured 5,100 gross register tons. She was powered by a 1500 IHP triple expansion steam engine fed by two coal fired boilers, turning a single propeller. The ship was transferred into the ownership of Hutchinson & Co. in 1908, and was operated by the Pioneer Steamship Co.

=== Final voyage and sinking ===
On November 7, 1913, John A. McGean left port in Lake Erie under the command of captain Chauncey R. Nye, upbound for Lake Superior with a 6000 ton load of soft coal. As it was Nye's 27th year sailing on the lakes and his second season as the McGean's captain, he was not deterred by the warnings of the approaching storm as he and his crew & ship set out toward Lake Huron

On November 9, the ship entered Lake Huron alongside the freighters Matoa and Howard M. Hanna Jr. Just behind the three ships were the Charles S. Price and Regina. As the storm intensified, Captain Nye made the decision to sail the vessel along the Michigan side of Lake Huron, as to shelter the ship from the intense winds and waves. The McGean was sighted for the final time off Tawas Point Light later that day. Sometime within the next few hours, the ship capsized and sank, killing all 23 of her crew. After the storm, the body of chief engineer Calvin Smith was found near Black's Point, Ontario (just south of Goderich, Ontario) in late November 1913. Second cook D.M. Betts' remains were identified at the morgue in Goderich, Ontario via a photograph and details furnished by the Lake Carriers' Association. His remains were sent home to Girard, Pennsylvania on November 20, 1913. The remaining crew, including captain Nye's body were never recovered. The McGean would be lost and not discovered for 72 years Portions of the wreckage were found by a local doctor along the shoreline at Bayfield, Ontario in mid-November 1913. The McGean was one of twelve ships lost with all hands during the storm.

=== Wreck ===
The wreck of the McGean was discovered by marine archaeologist David Trotter in 1985, near Port Hope, Michigan. The ship is resting upside-down at a depth of 195 ft (59 m), a depth only accessible by technical divers. The rudder is broken out of place, and the propeller is missing a blade. In addition to this, the stern is severely damaged and crushed.

All the damage indicates she was swamped by a large wave and capsized, the captain believably had her engines stopped before flipping over and hitting bottom, breaking off a propeller blade and tearing her rudder out of its mechanism

It is likely that the damage to the rudder played a significant part in the sinking. Without a rudder, the ship would be impossible to steer and would have drifted along with the current for some time, eventually falling into a trough and being swamped by one or more large waves. In addition to this, the severe damage to the ship's stern along with the empty cargo holds indicate that the ship may have continued to float upside down for some time after capsizing, spilling out its cargo of coal and slamming the stern into the lake floor while the lower part of the bow stuck out over the surface. The McGean would not be the only ship to do this in the aftermath of the great storm, as the SS Charles S. Price is known to have floated for up to 8 days after capsizing.
