= SS Argus (1903) =

American lake freighter (1903–1913)

Coordinates: 44°18′10.94″N 82°49′30.75″W

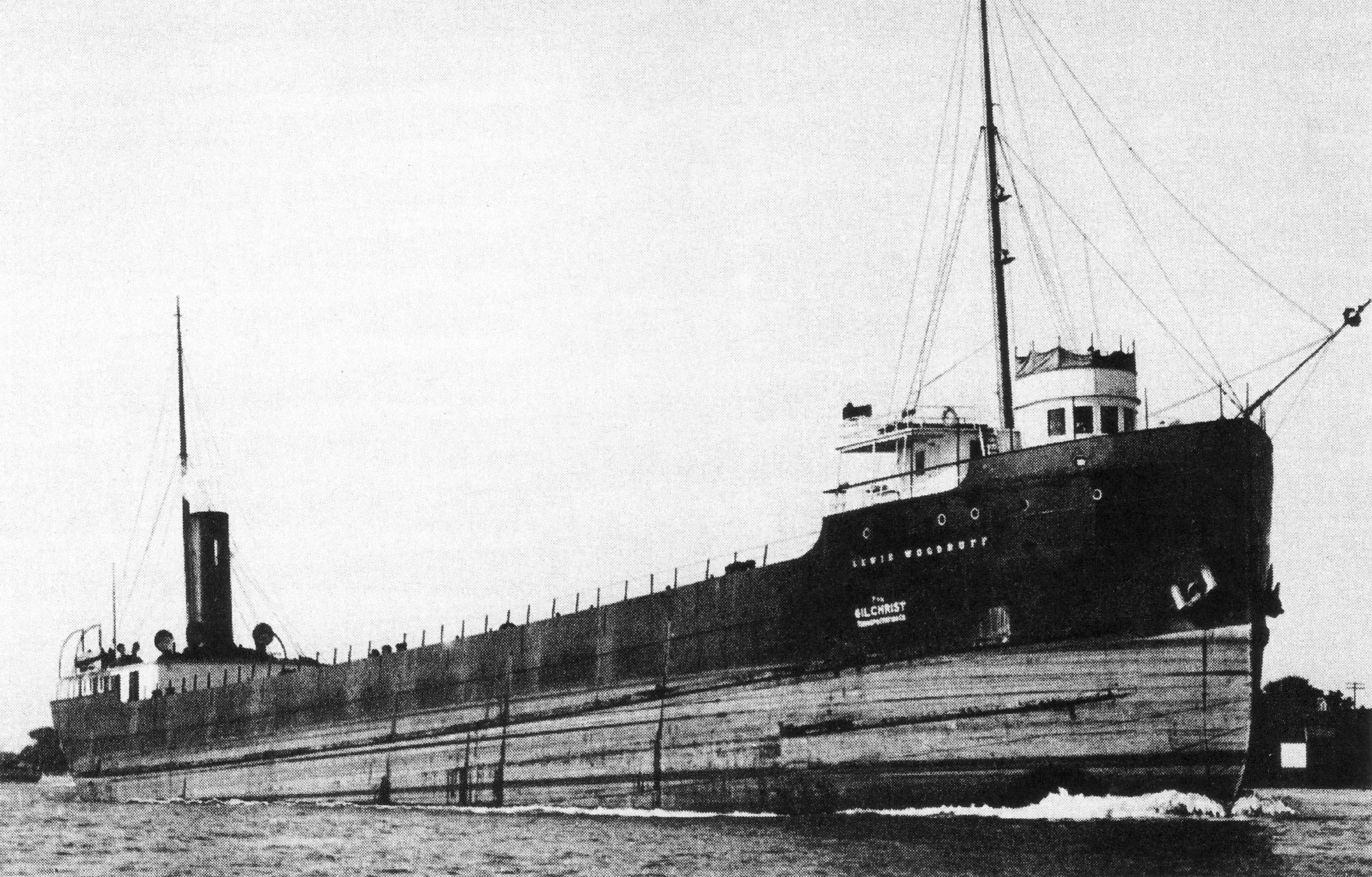

History

United States
- Name: Lewis Woodruff (1903–1913); Argus (1913–1913)
- Operator: Gilchrist Transportation Company (1903–1913); Interlake Steamship Company (1913–1913)
- Port of registry: Fairport, Ohio
- Builder: American Ship Building Company, Lorain, Ohio
- Cost: $275,000 ($7.69 million in 2024) (Note: Johnston, Louis & Williamson, Samuel H. (2023). "What Was the U.S. GDP Then?". MeasuringWorth. United States Gross Domestic Product deflator figures follow the MeasuringWorth series.)
- Yard number: 326
- Launched: 5 August 1903
- Christened: Martha Wood
- Maiden voyage: 2 September 1903
- Out of service: 9 November 1913
- Identification: US official number 200211
- Fate: Sank on Lake Huron

General characteristics
- Class & type: Lake freighter
- Tonnage: 4,707 GRT; 3,380 NRT
- Length: 436 feet (132.9 m) o/a; 416 feet (126.8 m) p/p
- Beam: 50 feet (15.2 m)
- Depth: 28 feet (8.5 m)
- Installed power: Engine: 1 × 1,480 ihp (1,100 kW) 90 RPM triple expansion steam engine; Boilers: 2 × 170 pounds per square inch (1,200 kPa) Scotch marine boilers
- Propulsion: 1 × propeller
- Capacity: 7,000 long tons (7,112 t) (Note: One source list the capacity as 6,200 long tons (6,299 t).)

SS Argus was an American lake freighter in service between 1903 and 1913. She was built under the name Lewis Woodruff by the American Ship Building Company in Lorain, Ohio, for the Gilchrist Transportation Company of Cleveland, Ohio. In 1913, she was sold at auction to the Pickands Mather & Company's Interlake Steamship Company three years after the Gilchrist fleet went into receivership, and was renamed Argus. She was involved in multiple accidents.

On the morning of 9 November 1913, Argus entered Lake Huron under the command of Captain Paul Gutch, upbound with a cargo of coal for Chicago, Illinois, loaded in Sandusky, Ohio, and Buffalo, New York. As Argus ventured out onto open water, she encountered heavy snowfall and large waves from the most destructive storm in the history of the Great Lakes. Later that day while labouring in the heavy seas, Argus sank, killing her entire crew. Her loss was the only one to be witnessed by the crew of another vessel.

The wreck of Argus was located upside down around 13 miles (20.9 km) north of Point Aux Barques in 1972, with damage to her stern.

== History ==
=== Background ===
In 1843, the gunship USS Michigan became the first iron-hulled vessel built on the Great Lakes upon her launching in Erie, Pennsylvania. Though Canadian merchants were importing iron vessels prefabricated in the United Kingdom by the mid-1840s, the first regionally produced iron-hulled merchant vessel, Merchant, would not be built until 1862. Despite Merchant's clear success proving the potential of iron hulls, ships built from wood remained preferable until the 1880s due to their lower cost, as well as the abundance of high-quality timber and workers trained in carpentry. Between the early 1870s and the mid-1880s, shipyards around the Great Lakes began to construct iron ships on a relatively large scale.

In 1884, the first steel freighters were built on the Great Lakes, with metal becoming a material used in the construction of new hulls by the 1890s. Rapidly decreasing steel prices, combined with the development of the pneumatic rivet gun and the advancement of gantry cranes enabling shipyard employees to work at an increased speed and with greater efficiency, contributed to the rapid increase in the size of lake freighters in the late 19th and early 20th centuries.

Throughout the 1880s, the iron ore trade on the Great Lakes grew quickly, primarily due to the increasing size of the lake freighters and the rise in the number of trips they made to the ore docks of Lake Superior. With the railways unable to keep up with the rapid extraction of iron ore, bulk freighters became an integral component in the region's iron ore industry. By 1890, 57% of the 16,000,000 long tons (16,256,751 t) of the iron ore produced by mines in the United States was sourced from the region surrounding Lake Superior.

Joseph C. Gilchrist was a major vessel operator on the Great Lakes in the late-19th and early-20th centuries, eventually amassing the second largest American-owned fleet on them. He would regularly order numerous "classes" of identical vessels in bulk, from multiple shipyards. In October 1902, the Detroit Free Press reported on Gilchrist's order of six identical freighters, two from the American Ship Building Company.

=== Design and construction ===
Lewis Woodruff (Note: Also erroneously reported as Louis Woodruff, or Louis G. Woodruff.) was built by the American Ship Building Company at their yard in Lorain, Ohio, at a cost of $275,000 ($7.69 million in 2024), as yard number 326. She was built for the Gilchrist Transportation Company of Cleveland, Ohio, and was the first of eight identical "6,200–ton" vessels commissioned for that fleet from the American Ship Building Company. One of her sister ships included R. E. Schuck, later named Hydrus. She was named in honour of Captain Lewis Woodruff, a prominent citizen of Cleveland, who maintained a financial stake in the Gilchrist fleet.

Contrary to customs on the Great Lakes, Lewis Woodruff was launched at 12:00 on 5 August 1903, a Wednesday, when most launchings were carried out on Saturdays. She was christened in front of a substantial crowd by Martha Wood of Bellevue, Ohio, one of Gilchrist's guests at the event.

She was built on the channel system, a longitudinal frame style introduced on the Great Lakes in the mid-1890s. It consisted of several rows of flanged steel plates running the entire length of a vessel's bottom, deriving its name from the "channels" between the frames. This method provided vessels with additional strength, as well as preventing damage sustained in groundings from spreading to other areas of the hull, and increasing cargo capacity. In spite of rapid advances in shipbuilding technology, the hold of Lewis Woodruff remained reminiscent of those found on wooden lake freighters. Between 1882 and 1904, the cargo holds of all iron and steel freighters contained stanchions, vertical columns designed to support their decks; and steel angles which were the equivalent of the knees used on wooden freighters. (Note: It would not be until 1904 that the traditional construction methods were dispensed with in favour of steel arches and sloped side "hopper" tanks, in the freighter Augustus B. Wolvin.)

Her 12 hatches, which were longitudinally 8 feet (2.4 m) in depth, were positioned 24 feet (7.3 m) apart, when measured from their centres. Her hull contained three watertight bulkheads. The cargo hold was divided into four separate compartments; the first of which was 1,600 long tons (1,626 t) in capacity, while the remaining three had a capacity of 1,750 long tons (1,778 t). Her overall capacity was listed as 7,000 long tons (7,112 t).

Lewis Woodruff was a medium-sized freighter by the standards of the early-20th century. Her hull had an overall length of 436 feet (132.9 m), a length between perpendiculars of 416 feet (126.8 m). Additionally, the hull was 50 feet (15.2 m) in beam, and 28 feet (8.5 m) in depth. The measurements of her register tonnage were calculated as 4,707 gross and 3,380 net tons, respectively.

She was powered by a 1,480 ihp (1,100 kW) 90 rpm triple expansion steam engine; the cylinders of the engine were 22 inches (55.9 cm), 35 inches (88.9 cm), and 58 inches (147.3 cm) in diameter, and had a stroke of 40 inches (101.6 cm). Steam was provided by two Scotch marine boilers 13.2 feet (4.0 m) in diameter, 11.6 feet (3.5 m) in length, with a working pressure of 170-pound-per-square-inch (1,200 kPa). The boilers were each fitted with four furnaces, accounting for a combined grate surface of 88 square feet (8.2 m^{2}), and a total heating surface of 4,292 square feet (398.7 m^{2}). The engine and boilers were supplied by the American Ship Building Company's yard in Cleveland.

=== Service history ===
Lewis Woodruff was assigned the US official number was 200211, while her port of registry was Fairport, Ohio.

She was completed by 26 August 1903, and was scheduled to embark on her maiden voyage on 29 August, after taking on fuel at the Baltimore & Ohio Railroad's coal dock in Lorain. She was set to sail to Duluth, Minnesota, without cargo, where she would load a cargo of iron ore. However, while travelling to the Baltimore & Ohio coal dock, Lewis Woodruff struck a pile, shearing off a blade of her propeller. She was forced to dock for repairs. Lewis Woodruff began her maiden voyage on 2 September. She passed Detroit, Michigan, at 04:00 on 2 September; and locked through the Soo Locks at Sault Ste. Marie, Michigan, at 05:30 a day later. She arrived in Duluth on 5 September.

While loaded with a cargo of coal, Lewis Woodruff ran hard aground on Walpole Island in the St. Clair River, early on the morning of 28 August 1904, due to dense fog. Her bow lifted 2 feet (0.6 m) out of the water, with the Detroit Free Press speculating that lightering would be necessary to free her. The tugs Ottawa and Sarnia of the Reid Wrecking Company succeeded in freeing her late on 28 August.

In late-June 1905, Lewis Woodruff was involved in a collision with the freighter W. C. Richardson in fog. She struck W. C. Richardson on the starboard side, while underway in the vicinity of the Soo Locks. Lewis Woodruff's bow suffered severe damage in the accident. She passed Port Huron, Michigan, on 6 July, downbound for Cleveland, where she was scheduled to receive an inspection and repairs. The Plain Dealer estimated repairs would take a week to ten days.

On the night of 7 August 1909, while loaded with iron ore, Lewis Woodruff became wedged at the coal dock at Irishtown Bend in the Cuyahoga River. The freigher B. Lyman Smith, also inbound for the dock, became similarly stranded. Three other vessels were moored at the dock, leaving little room for Lewis Woodruff and B. Lyman Smith to pass. Tugs were able to remove the jam in over an hour, with none of the vessels suffering damage.

In addition to previous larger libels, several Gilchrist vessels, including R. E. Schuck, had smaller ones placed on them in January 1910, while docked in Superior, Wisconsin.

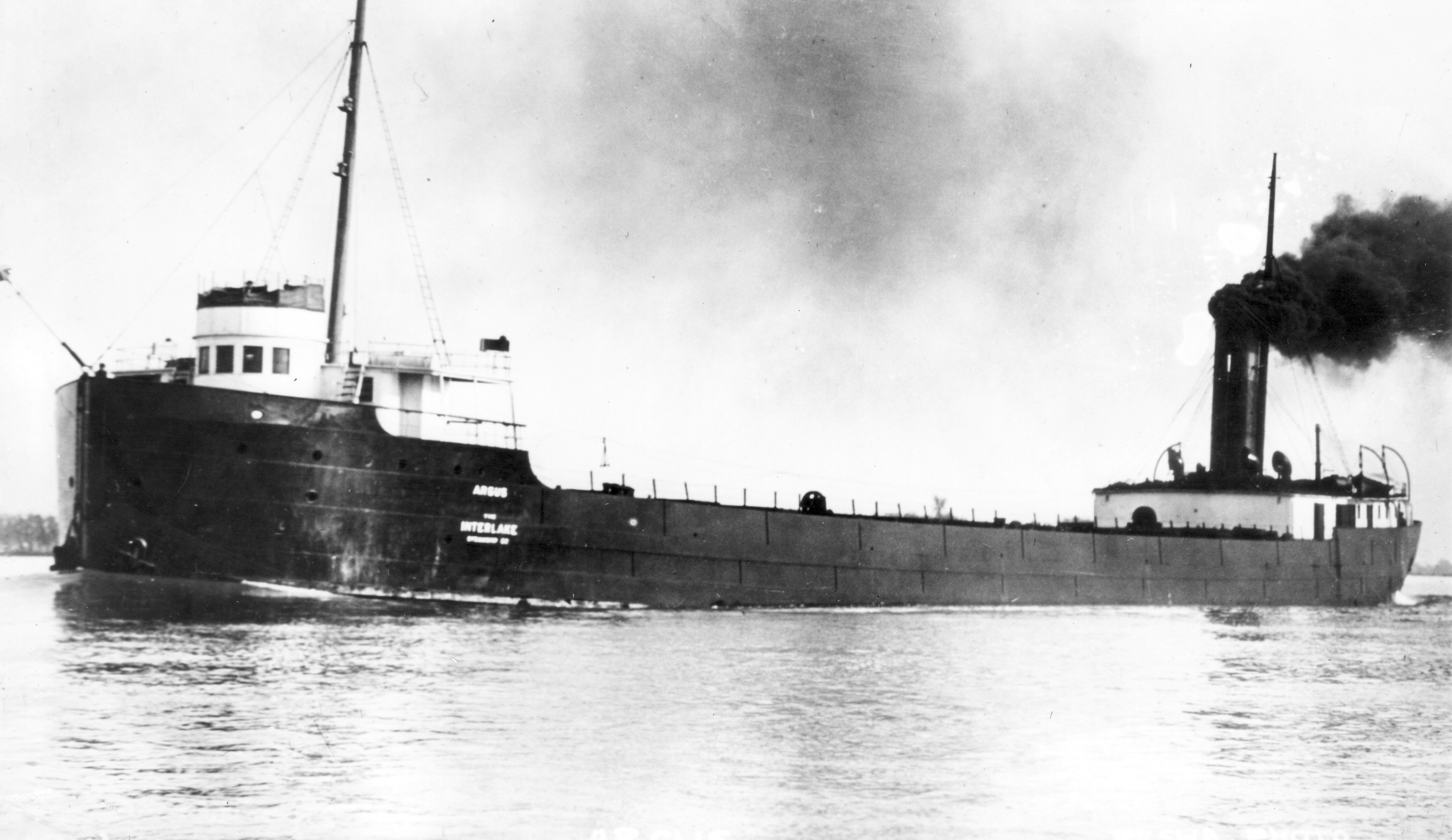
Argus, following her acquisition by the Interlake Steamship Company

Due to his rapid commissioning of several large vessels, Gilchrist accrued significant debts. The Panic of 1907 significantly impacted business on the Great Lakes, ensuring a significant glut of vessels in comparison to the quantity of cargo available to them. The Gilchrist fleet went into receivership in 1910, with Shane and George A. Garretson of the Bank of Commerce, major financiers of the business, being appointed as receivers. Following further financial hardship, the sale of the fleet was ordered by the United States District Court for the Northern District of Ohio in August 1912. A large portion of the fleet was sold at auction on 6 March 1913. Lewis Woodruff, along with seven other vessels, was appraised at $205,000 ($4.77 million in 2024).

She was sold to the Pickands Mather & Company of Cleveland, becoming one of 17 freighters absorbed into their newly-formed Interlake Steamship Company. She received the new name Argus, in an allusion to Greek mythology.

=== Final voyage ===
On 4 November 1913, Argus cleared Sandusky, Ohio, for Buffalo with 5,000 long tons (5,080 t) of soft coal, under the command of Captain Paul Gutch. (Note: Also reported as Paul Goetsch.) She arrived in Buffalo on 7 November, loading a further 2,000 long tons (2,032 t) of coal; she departed late that same day, and proceeded to Chicago, Illinois. (Note: Maritime historian Skip Meier reports Argus hauling 6,800 long tons (6,909 t) of coal for South Chicago.) As Argus sailed westward on 8 November, Lake Erie began experiencing inclement weather, with heavy snowfall severely limiting visibility. By nightfall, she had reached the Livingstone Channel in the Detroit River, passing Detroit, Michigan, at 17:40 on 8 November. Argus passed Port Huron, cleared the St. Clair River, and sailed upbound into Lake Huron on the morning of 9 November.

As Argus reached open waters, she encountered the large waves, significant snowfall, and sea smoke resulting from the most destructive storm in the history of the Great Lakes. Winds reached average speeds of 60 miles per hour (96.6 km/h), peaking at 90 miles per hour (144.8 km/h) off Harbor Beach, Michigan. The shape of Lake Huron, combined with the decreased surface friction of water allowed northwesterly winds the unimpeded ability to intensify. Sailors reported waves reaching at least 35 feet (10.7 m) in height.

Late on the afternoon of 9 November, the Pittsburgh Steamship Company's freighter George C. Crawford was travelling downbound, after the ferocity of the storm compelled her crew to turn around and seek shelter in lower Lake Huron. Her captain, Walter C. Iler, spotted Argus labouring in the storm, struggling to remain clear of the troughs between the waves. Argus's bow and stern each crested a wave, causing her unsupported midsection to buckle. Iler described his experience to the Detroit Free Press in the week following the storm.

The only boat I saw was one of Pickands, Mather & Co.'s fleet, the Argus I think it was. The storm swung her around in the trough of the sea, and she appeared to crumple like an eggshell and then disappeared.

Argus was the only victim of the storm whose sinking was witnessed. All 28 members of her crew were killed. (Note: Brown reports the number of lives lost aboard Argus as 28. Other sources list the number of dead as 23, or 24.)

=== Aftermath ===
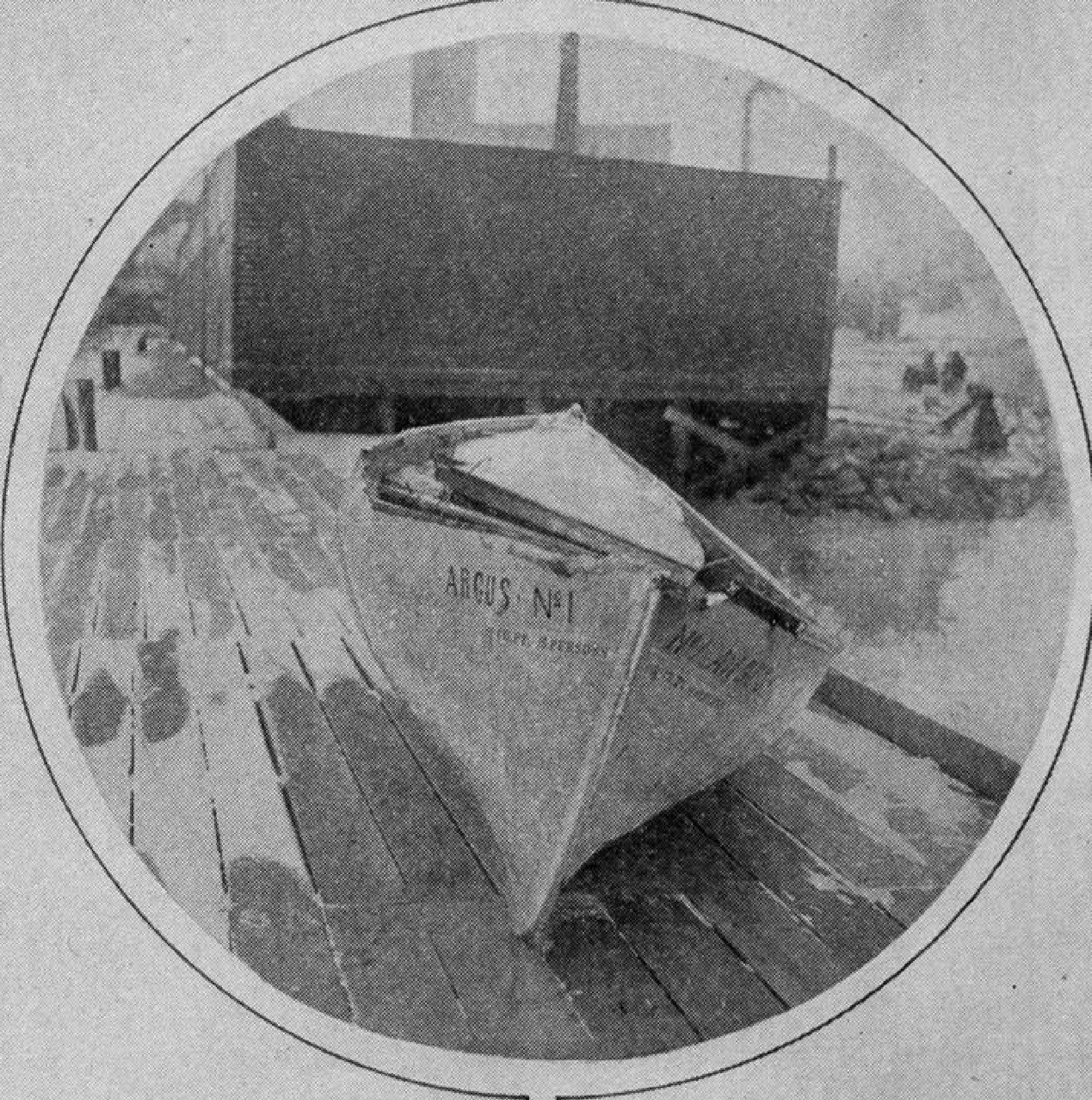
Argus' no. 1. lifeboat

Twelve ships sank during the storm of 1913, eight of them on Lake Huron. Argus was a $200,000 ($4.66 million in 2024) loss to her owners, with financial losses due to vessel destruction or damage from the storm totaling $3,055,000 ($71.1 million in 2024). (Note: The Marine Review valued Argus at $136,000 ($3.17 million in 2024), and her coal cargo at $15,000 ($349,202 in 2024).) In the aftermath of the storm, wreckage and bodies from Argus began drifting ashore, primarily concentrated around the Canadian southeastern shore of Lake Huron. The Lake Carriers Association offered a reward of $25 ($582.00 in 2024) for the recovery of each individual body.

== Wreck ==
The wreck of Argus was located in 1972, around 13 miles (20.9 km) north of Point Aux Barques by diver Richard T. "Dick" Race, while searching for the bow section of the freighter Daniel J. Morrell. Like most victims of the storm, she rests upside down; in between 220 feet (67.1 m) and 250 feet (76.2 m) of water. (Note: Various sources list her depth as 220 feet (67.1 m), 230 feet (70.1 m), or 250 feet (76.2 m).) Argus' wreck presents damage at the stern. Maritime historian Robert McGreevy proposes the theory that she capsized as a result of her unstable coal cargo, and like other wrecks from the 1913 storm such as Charles S. Price, Isaac M. Scott, and John A. McGean, possibly floated upside down for a significant time period, with her stern repeatedly striking the lake bottom. McGreevy describes the wrecks as being "[t]wisted and distorted like a tube of toothpaste". Argus was the first wreck to be discovered in the decades following the storm. (Note: The freighter Charles S. Price was discovered in the immediate aftermath of the storm, while the lightship LV–82 Buffalo was located a year later.)

== Sources ==
- "254 Lake Dead – Relief Needed". The Cleveland Leader. 15 November 1913. p. 1 – via Newspapers.com.
- "A Big Repair Job". The Plain Dealer. Cleveland. 8 July 1905. p. 5 – via Newspapers.com.
- "Arrivals and Sailings". The Plain Dealer. Cleveland. 5 November 1913. p. 11 – via Newspapers.com.
- "At Lorain". The Cleveland Leader. 30 August 1903. p. 13 – via Newspapers.com.
- "Big Boats in Collision". The Plain Dealer. Cleveland. 30 June 1905. p. 8 – via Newspapers.com.
- "Big Boats in Trouble". The Grand Rapids Press. 29 August 1904. p. 5 – via Newspapers.com.
- Birdsall, Mark (8 November 2022). "Upside-down: Divers, Historian May Have Solved Great Storm Mystery". Huron Daily Tribune. Bad Axe, Michigan. Archived from the original on 6 December 2022.
- "Boats Aground". The Times Herald. Port Huron, Michigan. 29 August 1904. p. 7 – via Newspapers.com.
- Bowlus, W. Bruce (2010). Iron Ore Transport on the Great Lakes: The Development of a Delivery System to Feed American Industry. Jefferson, North Carolina: McFarland & Company, Inc. ISBN 978-0-786433-26-1.
- Boyer, Dwight (1984) [1971]. True tales of the Great Lakes. New York City: Dodd, Mead and Company. ISBN 978-0-396063-72-8.
- Brown, David G. (2004) [2002]. White Hurricane: A Great Lakes November Gale and America's Deadliest Maritime Disaster. Columbus, Ohio: International Marine / McGraw-Hill. ISBN 978-0-071380-37-9.
- Bugbee, Gordon P. (February 1962a). "Iron Merchant Ships: An Upper Lakes Centennial - Part One" (PDF). Telescope. 11 (2). Detroit: Great Lakes Maritime Institute: 24–27 – via Maritime History of the Great Lakes.
- Bugbee, Gordon P. (March 1962b). "Iron Merchant Ships: An Upper Lakes Cenntenial – Part Two" (PDF). Telescope. 11 (3). Detroit: Great Lakes Maritime Institute: 46–51 – via Maritime History of the Great Lakes.
- "Bulk Freighters Built Since 1902". The Marine Review. 42 (2). Cleveland: The Marine Review: 65. February 1912 – via Maritime History of the Great Lakes.
- "Channel System of Ship Construction". The Marine Review. 11 (18). Cleveland: The Marine Review: 6. 2 May 1895 – via Maritime History of the Great Lakes.
- "Channel System of Construction". The Marine Review. 12 (12). Cleveland: 13–22. 12 September 1895 – via Maritime History of the Great Lakes.
- "Choctaw Shipwreck Site National Register of Historic Places Registration Form" (PDF). Washington D.C.: National Park Service. 2018. Archived from the original (PDF) on 1 January 2019.
- "Early Shipbuilding at Holland, Mich". The Marine Review. 28 (6). Cleveland: The Marine Review: 23. 6 August 1903 – via Maritime History of the Great Lakes.
- "Gilchrist Fleet Sold at Auction". The Marine Review. 43 (3). Cleveland: The Marine Review: 118. March 1913 – via Maritime History of the Great Lakes.
- "Gilchrist Will Have 75 New Boats". Detroit Free Press. 8 October 1902. p. 9 – via Newspapers.com.
- Green, Fred W. (1912). "Mitchell & Co.'s Marine Directory of the Great Lakes – 1912". Cleveland: Bureau Veritas – via Maritime History of the Great Lakes.
- "Hard Aground". The Daily Herald. Port Huron, Michigan. 29 August 1904. p. 6 – via Newspapers.com.
- Herriman, H. N. (1905). "Great Lakes Register – For the Construction and Classification of Steel and Wooden Vessels – 1905". Chicago: Lakeside Press. p. 104 – via Maritime History of the Great Lakes.
- Herriman, H. N. (1912). "Great Lakes Register – For the Construction and Classification of Steel and Wooden Vessels – 1912". Chicago: Lakeside Press – via Maritime History of the Great Lakes.
- "Interlake Steamship Co". The Marine Review. 43 (5). Cleveland: The Marine Review: 184-185. May 1913 – via Maritime History of the Great Lakes.
- "Jam in the River". The Plain Dealer. Cleveland. 8 August 1909. p. 11 – via Newspapers.com.
- Kohl, Cris (2008). The Great Lakes Diving Guide (2nd ed.). West Chicago: Seawolf Communications. ISBN 978-0-9679-9769-8.
- "Local Notes". The Times Herald. Port Huron, Michigan. 3 September 1903. p. 7 – via Newspapers.com.
- "Marine Notes". The Sandusky Star-Journal. Sandusky, Ohio. 2 September 1903. p. 3 – via Newspapers.com.
- "Marine Notes". The Plain Dealer. Cleveland. 31 August 1904. p. 10 – via Newspapers.com.
- "Marine Notes". The Buffalo News. 7 July 1905. p. 18 – via Newspapers.com.
- "Marine Notes". Detroit Free Press. 29 January 1910. p. 10 – via Newspapers.com.
- Meier, Skip (August 2013). "Interlake Steamship Company Celebrates Centennial – Part II". The Detroit Marine Historian. 66 (12). Marine Historical Society of Detroit: 3–6 – via Maritime History of the Great Lakes.
- "Other Ports". The Cleveland Leader. 6 September 1903. p. 8 – via Newspapers.com.
- "Passages – November 8". The Cleveland Leader. 9 November 1913. p. 13 – via Newspapers.com.
- "Port of Buffalo". The Buffalo Commercial. 7 November 1913. p. 7 – via Newspapers.com.
- "Port of Buffalo". Buffalo Courier. 8 November 1913. p. 2 – via Newspapers.com.
- Richards, Donald F. (November 1963). "The Great Storm – A 50th Anniversary Casualty List" (PDF). Telescope. 12 (11). Detroit: Great Lakes Maritime Institute: 247–253 – via Maritime History of the Great Lakes.
- "Saw Argus Disappear". Detroit Free Press. 16 November 1913. p. 14 – via Newspapers.com.
- Schumacher, Michael (2013). November's Fury: The Deadly Great Lakes Hurricane of 1913. Minneapolis: University of Minnesota Press. ISBN 978-0-816687-20-6.
- "Ship of the Month No. 137: W. C. Franz". Toronto: Toronto Marine Historical Society. April 1985 – via Maritime History of the Great Lakes.
- "Ship of the Month No. 168: Saskadoc". The Scanner. 21 (2). Toronto, Ontario: Toronto Marine Historical Society: 7 – 11. November 1988 – via Maritime History of the Great Lakes.
- "Ship of the Month No. 236: Scotiadoc". The Scanner. 29 (9). Toronto: Toronto Marine Historical Society: 6 – 12. 1997 – via Maritime History of the Great Lakes.
- "Shipwrecks". Ann Arbor, Michigan: National Oceanic and Atmospheric Administration. Archived from the original on 23 December 2021.
- "Soo Canal". Detroit Free Press. 4 September 1903. p. 7 – via Newspapers.com.
- "Steamer Woodruff Launched". The Plain Dealer. Cleveland. 6 August 1903. p. 8 – via Newspapers.com.
- Stonehouse, Frederick (1990) [1984]. Went Missing, II. Au Train, Michigan: Avery Color Studios. ISBN 978-0-932212-37-5.
- "The Greatest Storm in Lake History". The Marine Review. 43 (12). Cleveland: The Marine Review: 430-444. December 1913 – via Maritime History of the Great Lakes.
- Thompson, Mark L. (1994). Queen of the Lakes. Detroit: Wayne State University Press. ISBN 0-8143-2393-6.
- "Three More Boats Are Added Today to Storm Toll". The Grand Rapids Press. 14 November 1913. p. 1 – via Newspapers.com.
- "Two Boats in Trouble". The Plain Dealer. Cleveland. 29 August 1904. p. 8 – via Newspapers.com.
- "Vessel Passages – Detroit". Detroit Free Press. 3 September 1903. p. 3 – via Newspapers.com.
- "Will Sail Saturday". The Plain Dealer. Cleveland. 27 August 1903. p. 10 – via Newspapers.com.
- "Woodruff Broke Wheel". The Cleveland Leader. 1 September 1903. p. 9 – via Newspapers.com.
- "Woodruff Launched". The Cleveland Leader. 6 August 1903. p. 5 – via Newspapers.com.
- "Woodruff, Lewis". Bowling Green, Ohio: Bowling Green State University. Archived from the original on 11 August 2024 – via Historical Collections of the Great Lakes.
