= SS Charles S. Price =

Ship sunk in Lake Huron in 1913

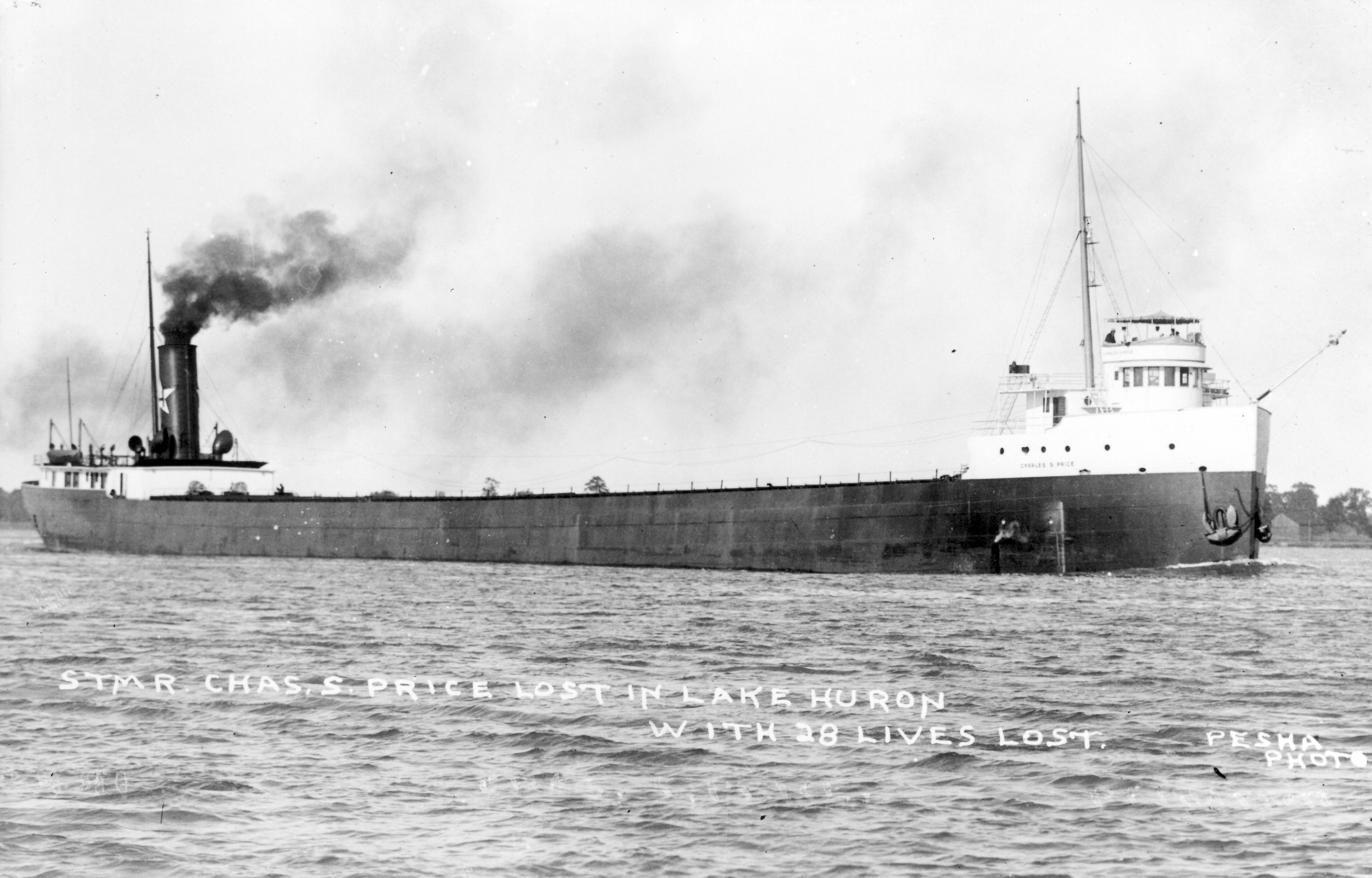
- Charles S. Price underway

History

United States
- Name: Charles S. Price
- Operator: Mahoning Steamship Company
- Builder: American Ship Building Company, Lorain, Ohio
- Yard number: 381
- Laid down: 1910
- Launched: May 14, 1910
- In service: June 7, 1910
- Out of service: November 9, 1913
- Fate: Capsized on November 9, 1913, sank 8 days later on November 17

General characteristics
- Type: Great Lakes freighter
- Tonnage: 6,372 GRT
- Length: 504 ft (154 m)
- Beam: 54 ft (16 m)
- Depth: 30 ft (9.1 m)
- Installed power: Two Scotch Marine boilers, one triple expansion steam engine
- Propulsion: Screw propeller
- Capacity: 9000 tons
- Crew: 28

SS Charles S. Price was a steel-hulled lake freighter. Launched on May 14, 1910 at Toledo, Ohio, the ship was operated for three years by the Mahoning Steamship Company before being lost on Lake Huron during the Great Lakes storm of 1913, along with all 28 crew members. The next day the ship was rediscovered floating upside down, with only its bow sticking out of the water, having capsized and partially sank during the storm. It was one of twelve ships lost with all hands on the same day, including Charles S. Price's nearly identical sister ship, Isaac M. Scott.

== History ==
=== Construction and description ===
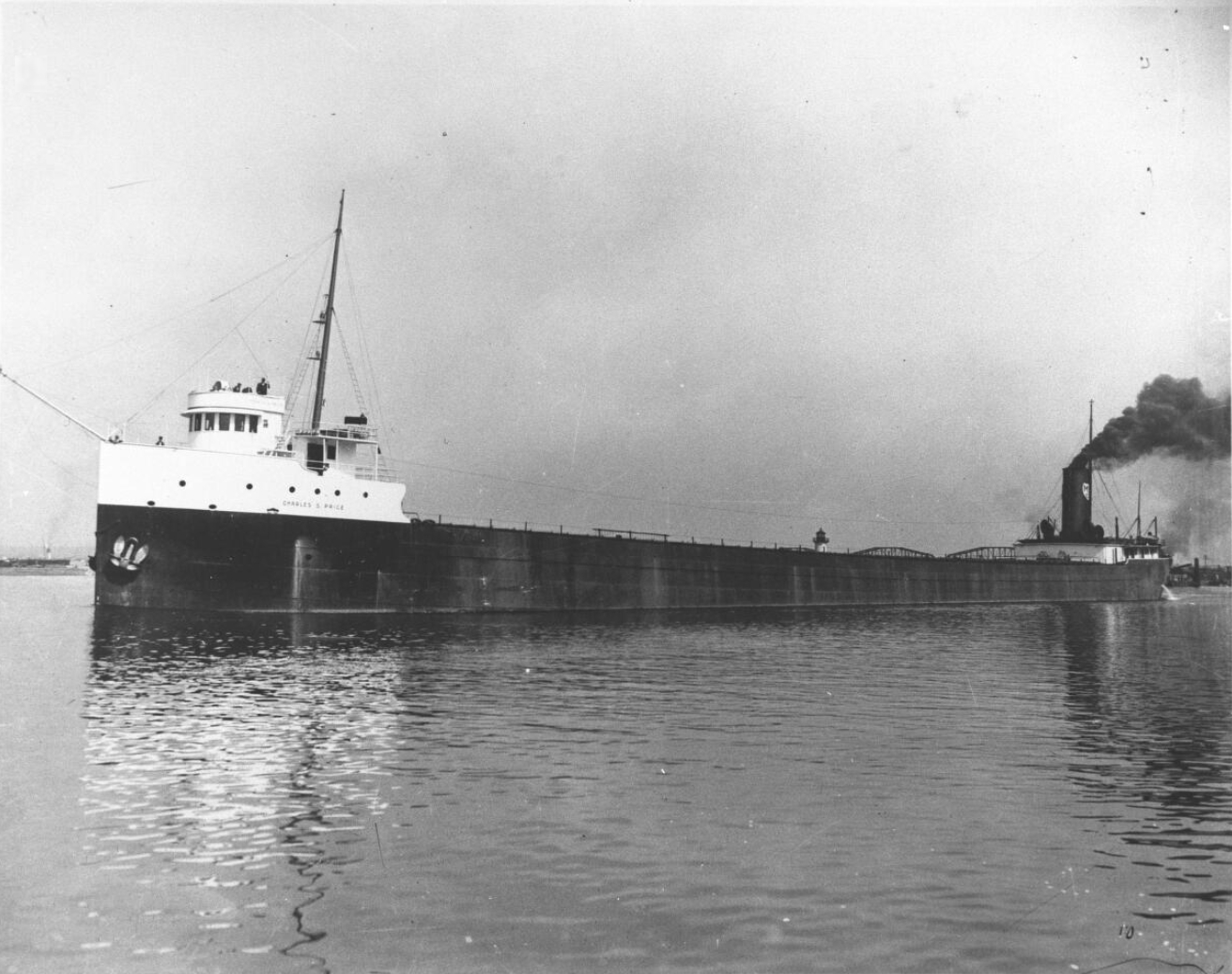
Charles S. Price in the St. Clair River, 1912

Charles S. Price was laid down in 1910 as hull number 381 at the American Ship Building Company shipyard in Toledo, Ohio. The ship was launched a few months later on May 14, 1910 and transferred into the ownership of the Mahoning Steamship Company, eventually entering into service on June 7 of the same year.

The ship was 504 ft (154 m) long, 54 ft (16 m) wide, had a depth of 30 ft (9.1 m) and was assessed at 6,372 gross register tons (GRT). It was powered by two Scotch marine boilers providing steam to a triple expansion engine, turning a single screw.

Charles S. Price was nearly identical in design to SS Isaac M. Scott, which was also constructed by the American Ship Building Company the previous year. Isaac M. Scott would also be lost with its entire crew during the Great Lakes storm of 1913, and is tied with Charles S. Price as well as SS John A. McGean for deadliest shipwreck of that day. Both ships are also tied for the tenth largest shipwreck in the Great Lakes.

=== Final voyage ===
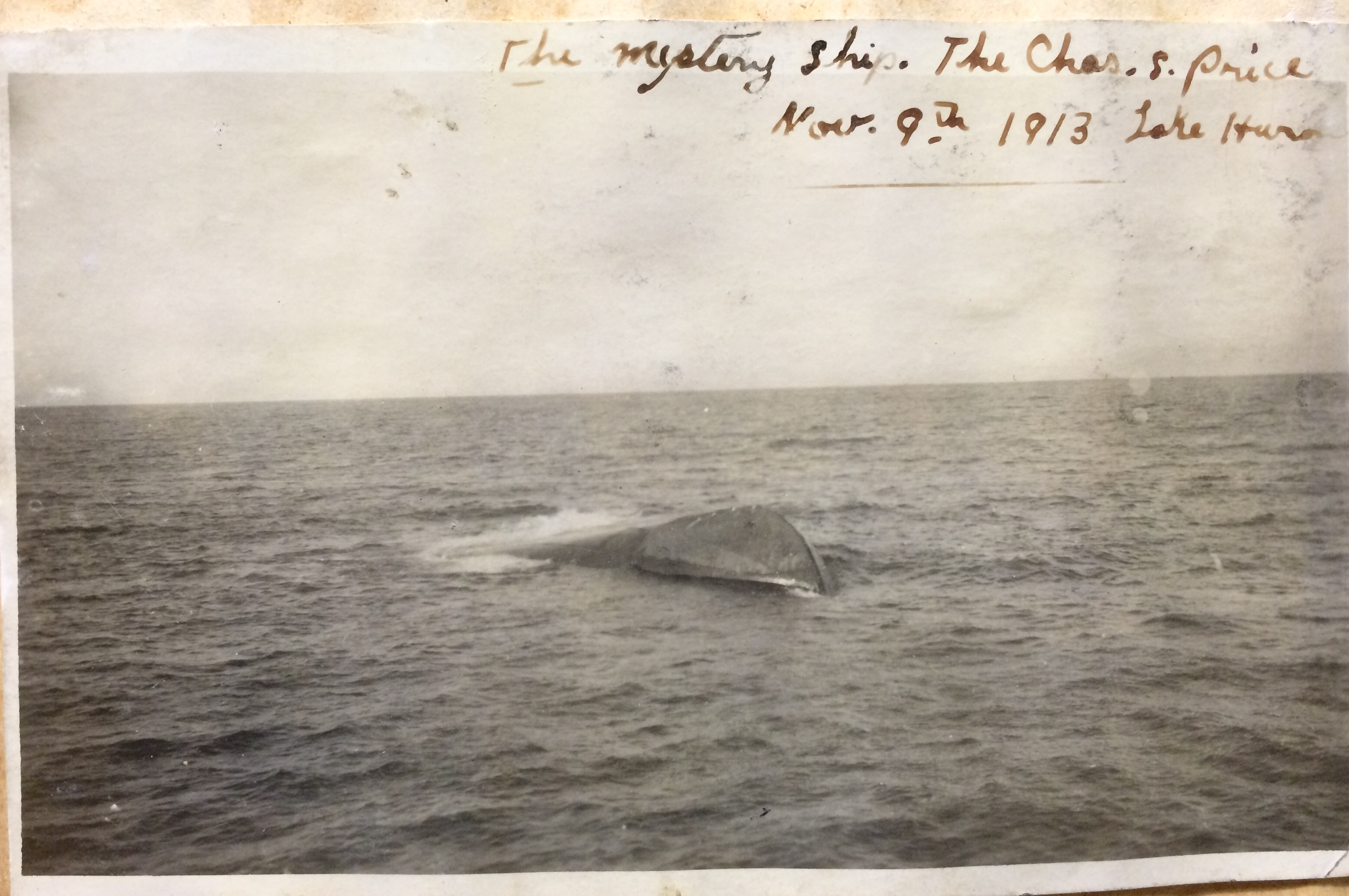
Bow of Charles S. Price before sinking into Lake Huron

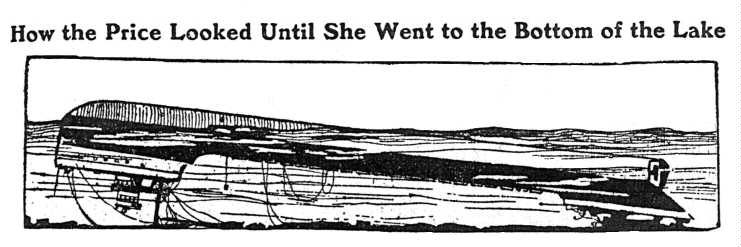
Illustration of how Charles S. Price looked when it was still floating on the surface of Lake Huron

Under the command of Captain William A. Black, the vessel left Ashtabula, Ohio on November 8, carrying 9,000 tons of coal and a crew of 28 people. The ship was last seen on November 9, heading north on Lake Huron by the crew of SS H.B. Hawgood, battling large waves and strong winds.

Charles S. Price was found the next day with its bow above water, and her stern dipping below. Because of its disposition, the ship's length could not be measured to make a positive identification of the vessel: the wreck was initially assumed to be Regina, another ship that had gone missing during the storm. It would take until November 15 for a diver to be sent to inspect the underwater portion of the wreck, who was able to identify the vessel as Charles S. Price. The ship later sank on November 17, roughly eight days after it initially capsized during the storm.

=== Collision theory ===
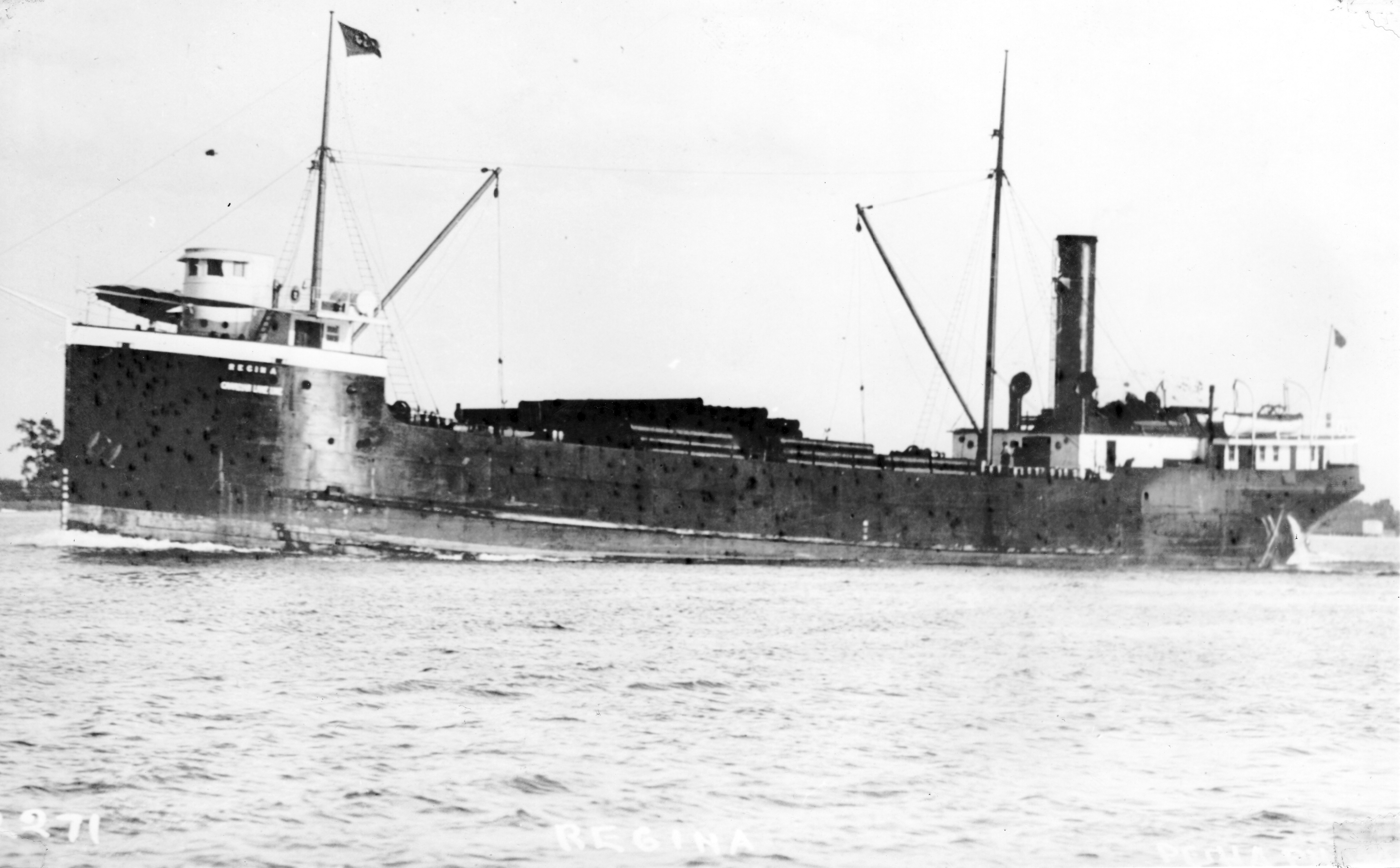
SS Regina, sometime prior to 1913

In the aftermath of the storm, debris and bodies identified as coming from both Regina and Charles S. Price washed ashore together, leading many to theorize that the two ships had collided during the chaos of the storm. This theory further increased in popularity when it was discovered that Chief Engineer John Groundwater of Charles S. Price was wearing a life preserver belonging to Regina, with some theorizing that Regina had rescued some of the survivors of Charles S. Price before it, too, had sunk. Although searches in the area of where CHarles S. Price had sunk failed to locate wreck of Regina, it would remain as the most popular theory until the salvage attempt in 1916, which would confirm that the wreck of Charles S. Price showed no damage consistent with a collision.

The wreck of Regina would later be located in 1986. It, too, showed no signs of being involved in a collision and is instead believed to have run aground and capsized.

=== Attempted salvage ===
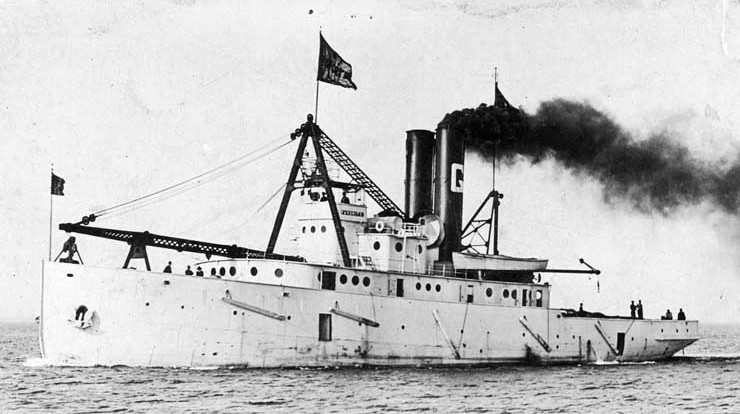
SS Favorite, the tugboat used by the Great Lakes Towing and Wrecking Company in its failed attempt to salvage Charles S. Price in the summer of 1916

The wreck of Charles S. Price was rediscovered in 1916, roughly three years after the ship's sinking. Shortly thereafter the salvage rights were sold to the Great Lakes Towing and Wrecking company. On June 8, 1916, the tugboat Favorite arrived at the wreck site to help in the salvage attempt. On June 18, the company successfully raised the bow of the ship from the lakebed. By June 23 the anchor and chains of the ship had been recovered. The company initially predicted that the ship would have been successfully salvaged by June 25, however work was unexpectedly halted until July 11 due to bad weather. Once the weather was clear, the company returned to the wreck. Divers cut a hole in the side of the aft hull, allowing them to enter the wreck where they would try to seal breaks in the hull and build bulkheads, after sealing off the inside they would then attempt to pump compressed air into the ship to refloat it. By the time work began, the company had come to the conclusion that salvaging the wreck would likely take an additional two weeks longer than initially expected.

By July 29 salvaging the wreck was decided to be too costly to be worth the expense for the Great Lakes Towing and Wrecking company. The company abandoned all attempts to raise her and the ship was lowered back into the lake for the last time. Two years later in 1918, the salvage rights were sold to the American Salvage Co, but they too were unable to recover any part of the wreck.

=== Wreck ===
The wreck is resting upside-down at a depth of 28.6 m (94 ft) approximately 11 miles (18 km) south of Lexington, Michigan. The ship is missing its rudder and its cargo holds are almost entirely empty as result of the ship drifting upside down for several days. During the initial salvage attempt in 1916 divers noted significant damage to the ship's stern. Captain Alex Cunning of Favorite also suggested that the ship's anchor chains may have been cut prior to the sinking. The lack of a rudder would have made the ship impossible to steer, causing it to fall into a trough and be battered by waves, some of which are estimated to have been up 38 ft (12 m) feet high. Eventually, the ship would capsize, although an air pocket would remain in the bow allowing it to continue floating for several days.

The wreck of Charles S. Price is protected as a part of the Sanilac Shores Underwater Preserve. The wreck is located at 43°09.174′N 82°21.174′W.

== Similar shipwrecks ==
The sinking of Charles S. Price occurred under very similar circumstances to several other shipwrecks that occurred during large storms on the Great Lakes, including those also lost during the "Great Storm of 1913." Examples include Argus, Isaac M. Scott, and John A. McGean, all of which also sank during the 1913 storm, as well as the sinking of William B. Davock, which was lost during the Armistice Day Blizzard in 1940. All ships sank as a result of a missing (or in the case of William B. Davock, jammed) rudder combined with being capsized by large rogue waves. In the case of John A. McGean and Argus, both ships contain evidence of having drifted upside-down for a significant period of time similarly to Charles S. Price, possibly for several hours or even days after initially capsizing. Although Charles S. Price was the only ship out of the three to have actually been observed floating before it sank.

== Gallery ==
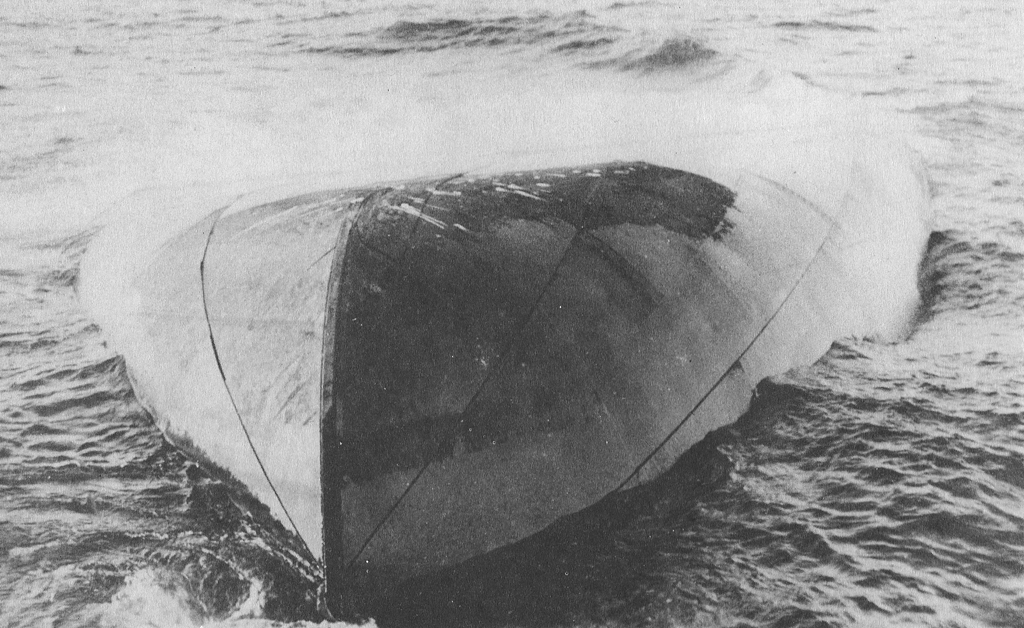
The wreck of Charles S. Price floating upside down after the storm

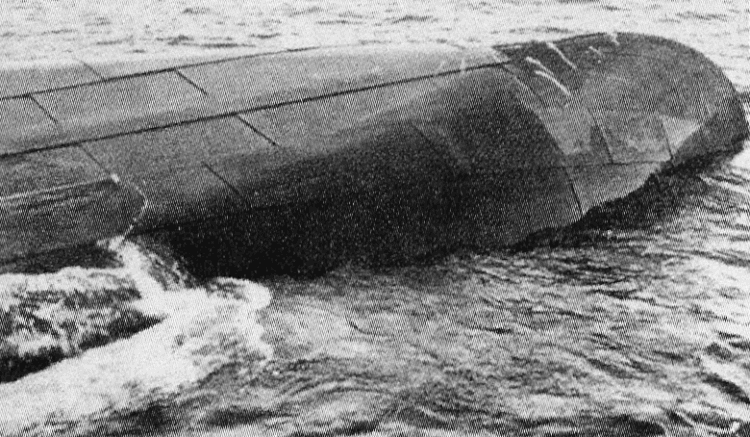
Another angle of the wreck of Charles S. Price after the storm

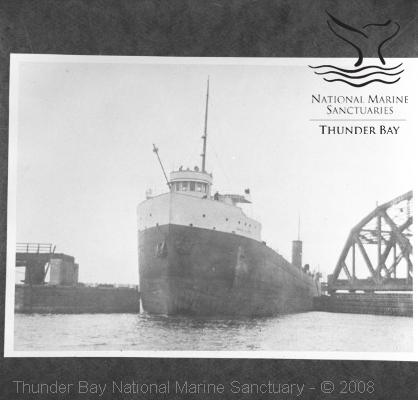
Charles S. Price passing through a drawbridge, sometime before 1913
