= SS Regina (1907) =

Steel ship that foundered in Lake Huron in a storm

Coordinates: 43°20.24′N 82°26.76′W

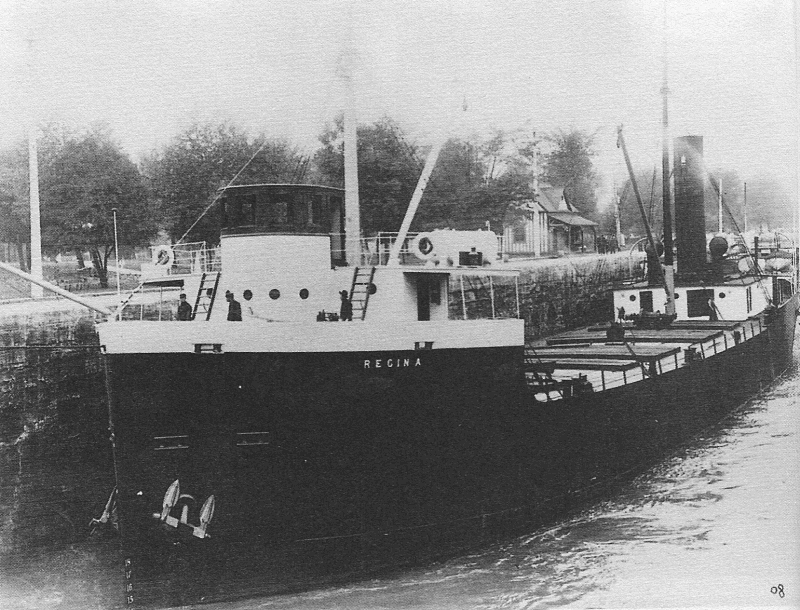
- Regina in 1910

History
- Name: Regina
- Owner: C.H.F. Plummer (1907–1912); Canadian Lake Transportation Company (1912); Canada Steamship Lines Inc. (1913)
- Port of registry: (United Kingdom of Great Britain and Ireland) Glasgow (1907–1912); (Canada) Toronto (1913)
- Ordered: 1907
- Builder: A. McMillian & Son, Dumbarton, Scotland
- Yard number: 419
- Launched: September 4, 1907
- Completed: October 1907
- Maiden voyage: January 19, 1907
- Out of service: 1913
- Fate: Capsized and sank between November 9 and November 10, 1913 during the Great Lakes Storm of 1913

General characteristics
- Type: Package Freighter
- Tonnage: 1,956 GRT
- Length: 250 ft 3 in (76.28 m) (lpp)
- Beam: 42 ft 6 in (12.95 m)
- Depth: 23 ft 0 in (7.01 m)
- Installed power: Two Scotch boilers
- Propulsion: Single screw; 1 × triple-expansion steam engine
- Speed: 8-10 knots
- Crew: 20
- Notes: Captain by 1913, Edward McConkey

SS Regina was a package freighter built for the Merchant Mutual Line and home ported in Montreal, Quebec. Named after Regina, Saskatchewan, Regina had a tonnage of 1,956 gross register tons (GRT) and a crew of 20.

The ship sank during the Great Lakes Storm of 1913 after taking great damage. Lost for more than half a century, she became known as the "Great Mystery of the Great Storm of the Great Lakes". Since its discovery, she has become an active dive site for scuba divers and is now part of Michigan's underwater Preserve system.

== Description ==
Regina was a steel-hulled cargo ship that had a tonnage of 1,956 gross register tons (GRT) and 1,280 net register tons (NRT). and measured 249 feet 3 inches (75.97 m) long between perpendiculars with a beam of 42 ft 6 in (12.95 m) with a depth 23 ft (7.0 m). The ship was powered by two Scotch boilers providing steam pressure to a triple-expansion steam engine turning one screw. The engine was built by Muir and Houston of Glasgow, Scotland, and was rated at 650 hp (480 kW).

== History ==
In 1907, Regina was built in Dumbarton, Scotland by A. McMillian & Son with the yard number 419. The order was placed by C.H.F. Plummer of Montreal, Quebec. The vessel was launched on September 4, 1907 and completed in October. The ship was initially registered in Glasgow, Scotland. In 1912 ownership was transferred to the Canadian Lake Transportation Company and in 1913 it was transferred to the Canadian Steamship Lines Incorporated (CSL), and the ship was re-registered in Toronto, Ontario. Regina was used as part of the package freight business by CSL, delivering a variety of cargoes to various ports along the Great Lakes.

=== Sinking ===
On November 9, 1913 Regina was heading north from Point Edward, Ontario on Lake Huron. During the night one of the worst storms in Great Lakes history arose. Waves raged up to 38 feet (12 m). At the time, Regina was carrying a varied cargo, with destinations set for ten ports. Among the cargo included enough canned goods to fill eight railroad cars, 140 tons of baled hay and stacked atop the upper deck were sewer and gas pipes.

During the storm captain McConkey initially made the attempt to keep on her upbound passage. Failing to keep full ahead, likely seeing another ship turn around, he did the same to return south back to the St. Clair river 7 miles (11 km) east of Lexington, Michigan, at some point, McConkey felt the ship hit something on her hull, realizing that now the ship was in peril, he dropped anchor and ran her pumps to hopefully slow the flooding, the crew dressed and prepared lifeboats to be lowered, while the crew abandoned Regina, McConkey blasted her whistle in distress hoping to rouse a lifesaving crew to save the crew. Later investigation of the ship's wreck found that the ship had run aground and had suffered a large hole near the cargo hold and several dents. Near Port Franks, Ontario, two bodies were found with a capsized lifeboat from Regina and another ten bodies were found on the beach a short distance away. There were no survivors from Regina.

Sailors initially theorized that Regina collided with Charles S. Price, another ship sunk in the storm, as some of the bodies of Charles S. Price's crewmen were wearing lifebelts from Regina. However, this theory was dismissed after Charles S. Price was found capsized on Lake Huron; a diver confirmed that the ship was Charles S. Price and that the ship showed no signs of being in a collision. Another theory suggested McConkey saw the Charles S. Price in trouble, and tried to help her crew, but with the Price more near Port Huron at the mouth of the St.Clair river, and Regina near Port Sanilac, that also can be dismissed

== Aftermath ==
Twelve ships foundered in the Great Lakes Storm of 1913, and there was confusion in determining where the shipwrecks were located. The day following the storm - November 10, 1913 - a huge steel freighter was discovered floating bottom side up on Lake Huron. The bow was about 30 feet (9.1 m) clear of the water, but the stern dipped underwater to such a degree that it was impossible to tell the length of the carrier. Every visible part of the hulk was coated with ice and there were no identifying marks in view. Originally, people assumed this vessel was Regina, as the visible length seemed to correspond to the size of the missing freighter. It was not until early on the morning of November 15 that the ship was identified as Charles S. Price, shortly before she sank on November 17. The front page of that day's Port Huron Times-Herald extra edition read, "BOAT IS PRICE — DIVER IS BAKER — SECRET KNOWN."

== Discovery and salvage ==
The wreck of Regina was discovered in 1986 in Lake Huron between Lexington and Port Sanilac, Michigan. The wreck is largely intact but is upside down and in about 77–80 feet (23–24 m) of water. She was discovered by Wayne Brusate, Colette Witherspoon, Garry Biniecki and John Severance. During a 1987 archaeological salvage expedition led by underwater archaeologist and shipwreck expert E. Lee Spence, tens of thousands of artifacts, including hundreds of intact bottles of still potable Scotch and champagne were recovered. Brusate and other divers made more than 400 dives on the wreck with permission from the Michigan State Department of Natural Resources, the Secretary of State and the United States Army Corps of Engineers, recovering an estimated 1% of the wreck's artifacts. The state and museums were given first choice of the artifacts, with Brusate keeping those unwanted items. In 2013, further artifacts were donated by Brusate to museums for display.

== See also ==
- SS Isaac M. Scott (1909)
- SS James Carruthers

== Sources ==
- Hancock, Paul (2001). Shipwrecks of the Great Lakes. Hong Kong: Thunder Bay Press. pp. 133–134. ISBN 1-57145-291-5.
- Schumacher, Michael (2013). November's Fury: The Deadly Great Lakes Hurricane of 1913. ebook. Minneapolis, Minnesota: University of Minnesota Press. ISBN 978-1-45294-045-8.
