= SS Isaac M. Scott =

American Great Lakes freighter

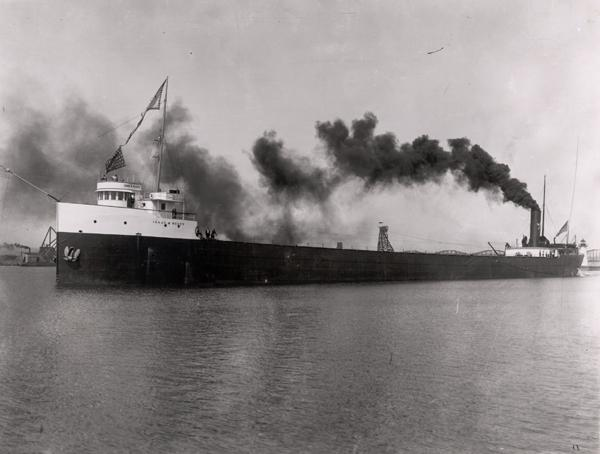
- Isaac M. Scott underway

History

United States
- Name: Isaac M. Scott
- Owner: Virginia Steamship Co.
- Port of registry: Lorain, Ohio, United States
- Builder: American Ship Building Company
- Yard number: 369
- Launched: 12 June 1909
- Completed: 2 July 1909
- Maiden voyage: 12 July 1909
- In service: 12 July 1909
- Out of service: 11 November 1913
- Fate: Sunk in Great Lakes Storm of 1913

General characteristics
- Type: Great Lakes freighter
- Tonnage: 6,372 GRT
- Length: 504 ft (154 m)
- Beam: 54 ft (16 m)
- Height: 30 ft (9.1 m)
- Depth: 30 ft (9.1 m)
- Installed power: Triple expansion steam engine
- Propulsion: Screw propeller
- Crew: 28

SS Isaac M. Scott was an American Great Lakes freighter that sank during the Great Lakes Storm of 1913 in Lake Huron, 6 to 7 miles (9.7 to 11.3 km) northeast of Thunder Bay Island (45°03.920′N 83°02.353′W), while she was traveling from Cleveland, Ohio, United States to Milwaukee, Wisconsin, United States with a cargo of coal.

She is tied with two other vessels (Argus and Charles S. Price) for the deadliest shipwreck during the Great Lakes Storm of 1913.

== Construction and description ==
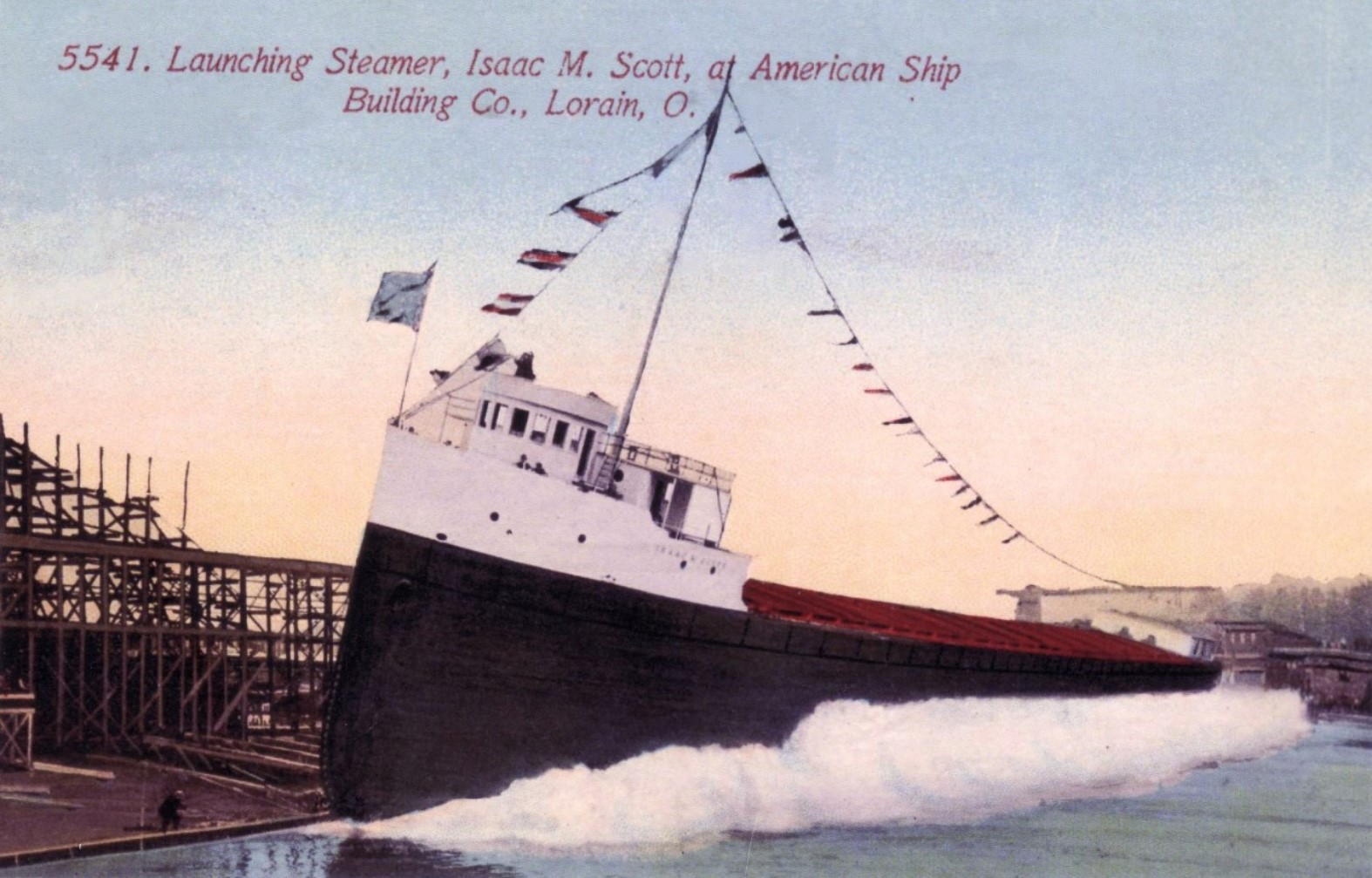
Launching of the Isaac M. Scott

Isaac M. Scott was built in 1909 at the American Shipbuilding Co. shipyard in Lorain, Ohio, United States and launched on 12 June 1909. She was completed on 2 July 1909. The vessel was named after the president of the La Belle Iron Works, serving from 12 July 1909 until her demise on 11 November 1913. The ship was 504 feet (154 m) long, with a beam of 16.5 metres (54 ft 2 in) and a draft of 9.1 metres (29 ft 10 in). The ship was assessed at 6,372 gross register tons (GRT). She had a triple-expansion steam engine driving a single screw propeller. At the time of her completion, the Toledo Blade called her "One of the handsomest of the large freighters on the great lakes."

== Maiden voyage disaster ==
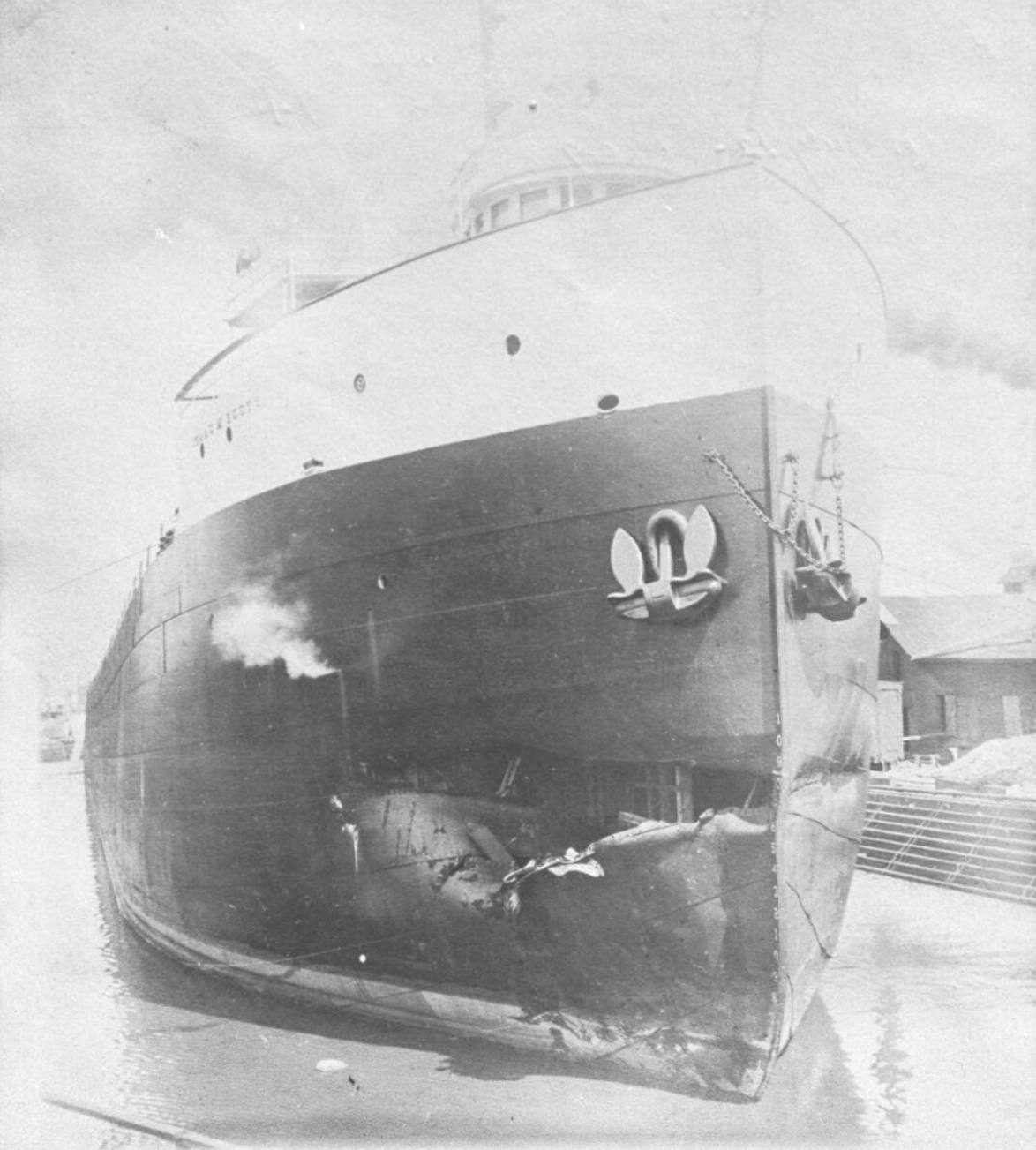
Isaac M. Scott after the collision with John B. Cowle

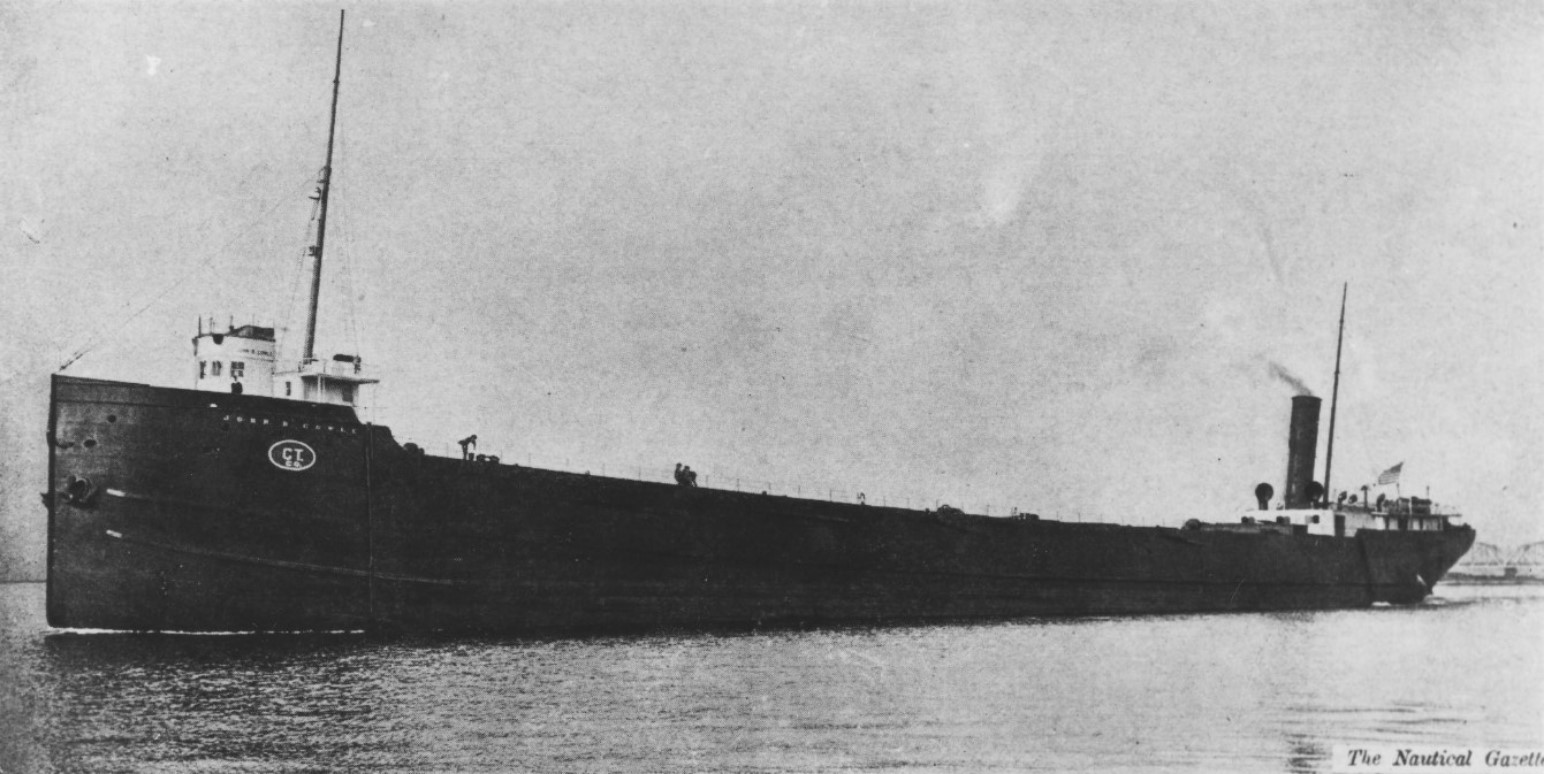
S.S John B. Cowle prior to being rammed and sunk by the S.S Isaac M. Scott

Isaac M. Scott's maiden voyage was marred by tragedy. At 4:00 AM on 12 July 1909, while travelling northwest about two miles (3.2 km) off the Whitefish Point lighthouse in a dense fog, Isaac M. Scott rammed SS John B. Cowle. John B. Cowle sank within a few minutes, taking 14 of her 24 crewmen with her to the bottom. The survivors were picked up by the Isaac M. Scott and taken back to port. Isaac M. Scott suffered damage to about 25 plates, which cost $30,000 in repairs.

In March 1910, the Virginia Steamship Company settled claims filed by relatives of men lost in the sinking of John B. Cowle in the amount of $20,000. Following an investigation and hearings, the United States Steamboat Inspectors at Marquette suspended Captain Rogers of John B. Cowle, as well as its pilot, Edward E. Carlton, for 30 days. They further ruled that both ships had been sailing too fast for the weather conditions, and that John B. Cowle had failed to signal properly. F. W. Wertheimer, who had been piloting Isaac M. Scott that day, was subsequently beached for one year.

== Great Lakes Storm of 1913 and sinking ==
In the pre-dawn hours of 9 November 1913, Isaac M. Scott, loaded with a cargo of coal worth $22,000 bound for Milwaukee, Wisconsin, United States, left Port Huron, Cleveland, Ohio, United States for the last time. She was one of several big freighters that passed out of the St. Clair River into Lake Huron and straight into the path of the deadliest storm in the Great Lakes history. Captain A. McArthur had been master of Isaac M. Scott since her maiden voyage back in 1909 and sailed with 27 other men on Isaac M. Scott's last voyage.

On 9 November 1913 at around 10:30 a.m. H. B. Hawgood was running before the storm when they spotted Isaac M. Scott, still heading north and making heavy weather of it, off Tawas Point, Michigan, just hours before the brunt of the storm struck. When communication was restored and newspapers began carrying accounts of the storm Isaac M. Scott was only listed as missing. The body of Captain McArthur washed up at Southampton, Ontario, Canada on 11 December 1913, still wearing his life preserver. One of her lifeboats was found 23 miles (37 km) north of the Chantrey Island lighthouse, off Southampton, Ontario. All 28 crew members perished in the disaster.

The sinking of Isaac M. Scott resulted in increased efforts by the U.S. Weather Bureau toward better weather forecasting and more rapid communication of storm warnings.

Isaac M. Scott was one of twelve vessels lost during the Great Lakes Storm of 1913. A storm described in the book Lore of the Lakes, as "The most disastrous that has ever swept our Great Lakes, both from loss of life and property, this unprecedented." The storm of heavy snow, bitter cold winds and frighteningly high waves took the lives of an estimated 235 mariners, 178 of whom were lost on Lake Huron alone.

The Isaac M. Scott was almost identical to the S.S. Charles S. Price, another vessel lost in the great storm of 1913.

== Wreck ==
Wreck location of Isaac M. Scott

Isaac M. Scott remained missing for 63 years. Located by divers in 1976 about six miles (9.7 km) off Northpoint, Michigan, she rests upside down and is half buried in mud under 55 metres (180 ft 5 in) of water with her nose still pointed into the storm. The wreck contains evidence that it was likely swamped by a large rogue wave resulting in the ship rolling over and sinking almost instantly. Her final resting place is now part of the 448 square miles (1,160 km^{2}) Thunder Bay National Marine Sanctuary and Underwater Preserve. The wreck lies at (45°03.920′N 83°02.353′W).
