= Storm oil =

Oil spread from ships to calm waves

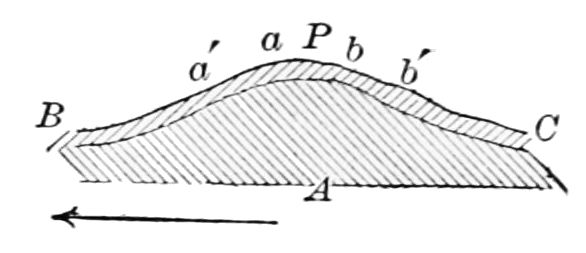
Diagram indicating how an oil layer increases surface tension and smooths waves.

Storm oil is described as nearly water-insoluble oil acting as a surfactant, and has been used since ancient times to smooth ocean waves. It has been historically employed to facilitate sea rescues and improve navigational safety, involving pouring the oil onto the ocean surface to reduce wave intensity. The nearly immiscible spilled oil acts as a surfactant, accumulating on the surface, and as waves locally stretch or compress, it leads to a concentration gradient inducing tangential shear forces leading to extra dissipation and damping. The phenomena were later discovered and scientifically explored by figures such as Benjamin Franklin, Lord Rayleigh, and Agnes Pockels, collectively deepening the scientific knowledge of surface tension and wave dynamics.

== Description ==
Steamships and lifeboats from many countries were required to carry them until the end of the 20th century. The United States Maritime Service Training Manual included storm oil in the list of general equipment aboard lifeboats, while the Merchant Shipping Act 1894 (57 & 58 Vict. c. 60) mandated them for British vessels until 1998. Frequently vegetable oil or fish oil was used as a cheap form of oil.

Oil has a damping effect on water and quickly forms a thin layer over a large expanse of the surface, which absorbs some of the energy of the waves. This prevents wind from getting traction along the water; thus, waves cannot form as easily.

== History ==
The practice can be traced back as far as 350 BC with Aristotle and to the early 1st century with Pliny the Elder. Aristotle described the use of oil as spreading on the eyes of divers with the intention of "quiet the surface and permit the rays of light to reach them". Whaling vessels are purported to have dangled blubber around the hull when in heavy seas to help calm the ocean. Benjamin Franklin famously investigated oil's calming properties on waves during his visits to England in 1757 to negotiate on taxation issues, demonstrating the effect on lakes such as Derwentwater. Communications between Franklin and William Brownrigg show that Franklin had first encountered the phenomenon aboard a ship in 1757 and investigated it several years later alongside Brownrigg and Sir John Pringle. This led to the discussion of the topic at the Royal Society on 2 June 1774. Franklin was also the first to do a controlled experiment on various ponds and lakes in England and the first to publish the findings as a scientific publication. Subsequent investigators included John William Strutt, 3rd Baron Rayleigh and his son, Robert Strutt, 4th Baron Rayleigh. In parallel, Agnes Pockels, working from her kitchen in Brunswick, Germany, experimented with the properties of oil monolayers on water, measuring the thickness of oil layers on water at approximately 1.3 nanometers. Her work studying storm oils through her surface film balance technique later influenced the design of tools like the Langmuir trough. Pockels also suggested that the calming effect of oil on water involved more than just reduced surface tension, including additional viscous resistance.
