= List of shipwrecks from the 1913 Great Lakes storm =

This is a list of shipwrecks during the Great Lakes Storm of 1913.

Ships foundered
Ship	Gross tons	Length (ft)	Beam (ft)	Built	Cargo	Approximate location	Damage ($)	Deaths
Lake Superior
Leafield	1,454	269	35	1892	steel rails	Angus Island	100,000	18
Henry B. Smith	6,631	525	55	1906	iron ore	Marquette, Michigan	350,000	25
Lake Michigan
Plymouth (Barge)	776	213	35	1854	Empty	Gull Island	5,000	7(6 sailors & 1 US deputy marshall whom the barge had lawsuits against it)
Lake Huron
Argus	4,707	436	50	1903	coal	Point aux Barques, Michigan	136,000	28
James Carruthers	7,862	550	58	1913	grain	Harbor Beach, Michigan	410,000	22
Hydrus	4,700	436	50	1903	iron ore	Lexington, Michigan	136,000	27
SS John A. McGean	5,100	436	52	1908	coal	Port Hope, Michigan	240,000	23
Charles S. Price	6,322	524	54	1910	coal	Port Huron, Michigan	340,000	28
Regina	1,956	249	42.5	1907	steel pipe, package freight	Port Sanilac, Michigan	125,000	20
Isaac M. Scott	6,372	524	54	1909	coal	Alpena, Michigan	340,000	28
Wexford	2,104	250	40	1883	Wheat	8.6 miles NNE of Grand Bend, Ontario	125,000	(actual number uncertain) 17 to 24 victims reported
Lake Erie
United States lightship LV-82 Buffalo	180	105	21	1912	none	Point Abino, Ontario, Canada	25,000	6 {Lightship salvaged}
Ships stranded
Ship	Gross Tons	Length (ft)	Beam (ft)	Built	Cargo	Approx Location	Damage ($)	Notes
Lake Superior
Fred G. Hartwell	6,223	504	58	1908	unknown	Point Iroquois, Michigan	30,000	rebuilt
Huronic	3,330	321	43	1902	passengers	Whitefish Point, Michigan	30,000	
J.T. Hutchinson	3,734	346	48	1901	unknown	Point Iroquois, Michigan	40,000	
Major	1,864	303	41	1889	unknown	Crisp Point, Michigan	unknown	rebuilt
William Nottingham	4,234	377	50	1902	wheat	Whitefish Bay, Michigan	75,000	3 men lost
Scottish Hero	2,202	297	40	1895	unknown	unknown	500	
Turret Chief	1,881	273	44	1896	unknown	Copper Harbor, Michigan	unknown	rebuilt 1914 as Salvor
L.C. Waldo	4,466	472	48	1896	iron ore	Gull Rock, Michigan	unknown	rebuilt 1916 as Riverton
St. Marys River
Meaford	unknown	unknown	unknown	unknown	unknown		500	
Lake Michigan
Halsted (Barge)	497	191	32	1873	lumber	Washington Harbor, Washington Island (Wisconsin)	unknown	
Louisiana	1,753	287	39	1887	empty	Washington Harbor, Washington Island (Wisconsin)		burned to waterline
Pontiac	2,298	300	40	1889	unknown	Simmon's Reef	7,500	
Lake Huron
Acadian	2,305	246.5	43	1908	unknown	Thunder Bay, Michigan	30,000	
Lightship # 61 aka "Corsica Shoals"	160	87'2"	21'6"	1893	none	Forced from Corsica Shoals to Point Edward Canada-reportedly contributed to loss of "Matthew Andrews" {See article United States lightship Huron (LV-103)}		refloated
Matthew Andrews	7,014	532	56	1907	unknown	Corsica Shoal	2,500	refloated
Howard M. Hanna Jr.	5,667	500	54	1908	coal	Port Austin, Michigan		rebuilt 1916
Henry A. Hawgood	6,839	552	56	1906	unknown	Weis Beach	7,000	refloated
J.M. Jenks	4,644	414	50	1902	unknown	Georgian Bay	25,000	
Matoa	2,311	310	40	1890	coal	Point aux Barques, Michigan	117,000	0
D.O. Mills	6,598	532	58	1907	unknown	Harbor Beach, Michigan	45,000	refloated
Northern Queen	2,476	300	41	1889	unknown	Kettle Point 44, Ontario	25,000	
A.E. Stewart	3,943	356	50	1902	unknown	Thunder Bay, Michigan	30,000	refloated
St. Clair & Detroit Rivers
W.G. Pollock	4,872	420	52	1906	unknown	St. Clair Flats	5,000	
Saxona	4,716	418	50	1903	unknown	Lake St. Clair	1,500	
Victory	4,527	450	48	1895	unknown	Livingston Channel	12,000	
Lake Erie
Donaldson (Barge)	unknown	unknown	unknown	unknown	unknown	Cleveland, Ohio	800	
C.W. Elphicke ^{1}	2,058	273	42	1889	flax	Long Point, Ontario	unknown	Stranded in a late October gale early on in 1913, on Lake Erie, lost to the hurricane before salvaging could happen
Fulton	unknown	unknown	unknown	unknown	unknown	Bar Point	2,500	
G.J. Grammer	4,471	418	48	1902	unknown	Lorain, Ohio	1,500	refloated
Pittsburgh Steamship; Co. Barges	unknown	unknown	unknown	unknown	unknown	Cleveland, Ohio	100,000	unmanned
1. The steamer C.W. Elphicke reportedly struck a submerged obstruction on Lake Erie, off Long Point, on October 21, 1913, during a gale; it was beached just above the Long Point Lighthouse 2 1/2 hours later. Before it could be salvaged, the November gale hit and it became a total loss. No lives lost. It was on voyage from Fort William, Ontario, for Buffalo, NY, with cargo of flax.

== Vessels gallery ==
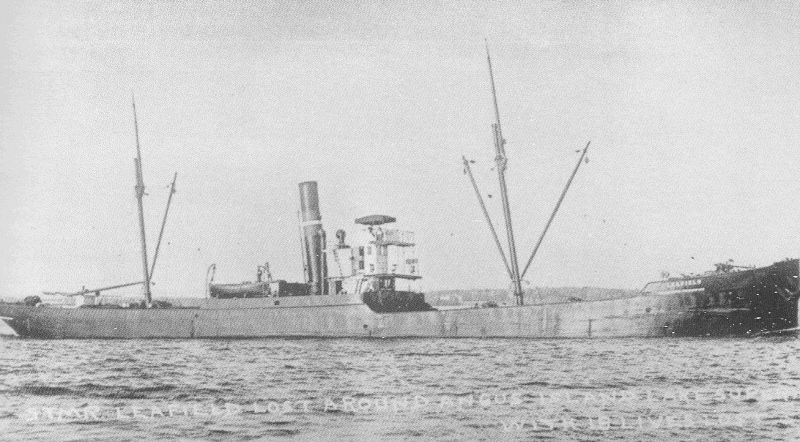
"Leafield"

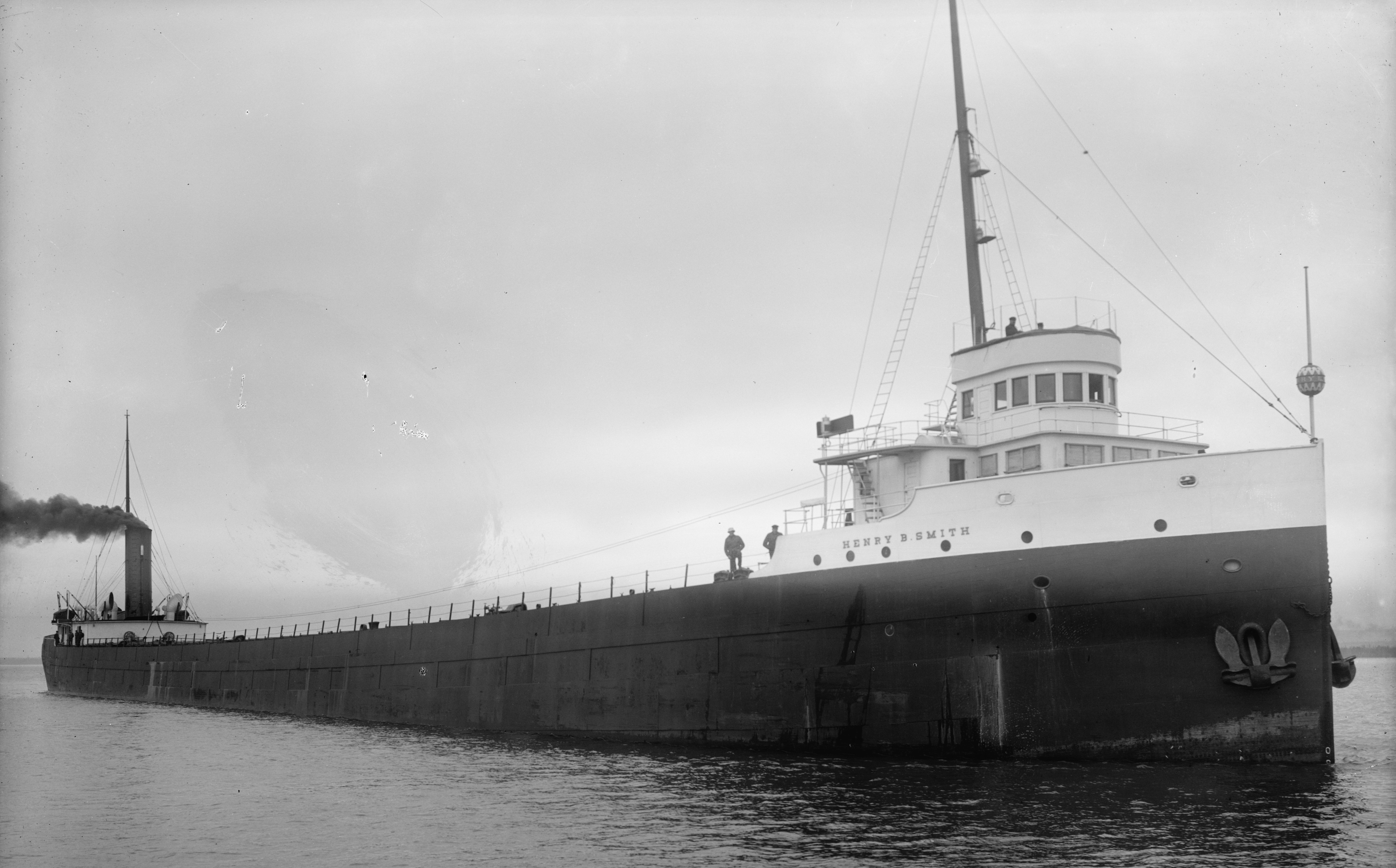
"Henry B Smith"

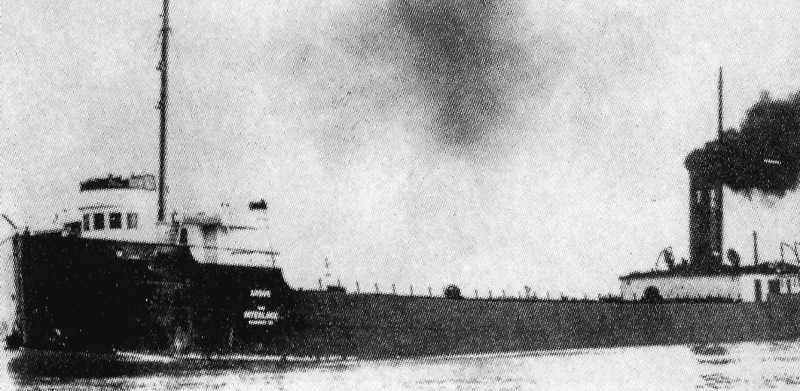
"Argus"

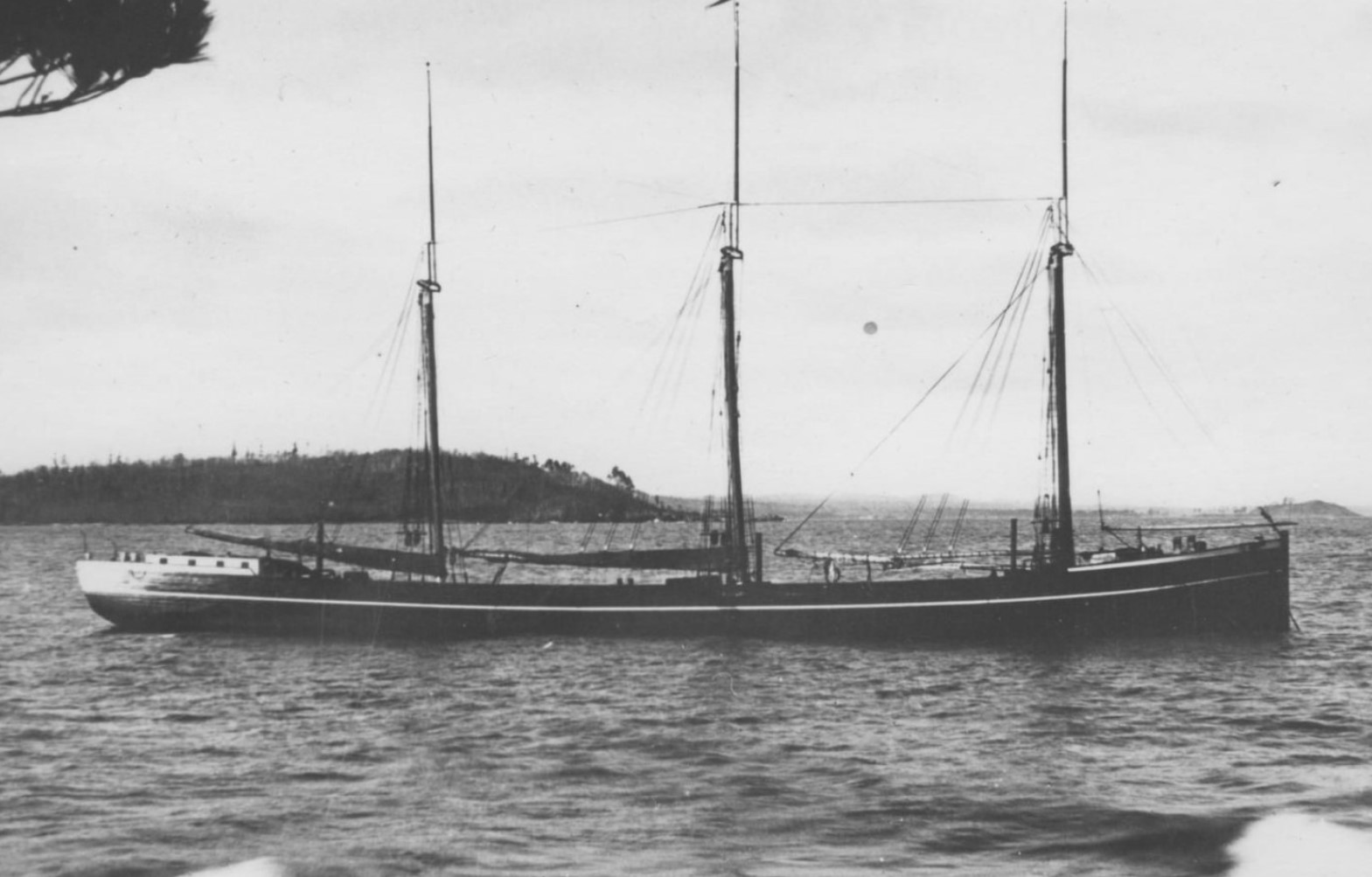
"Plymouth"

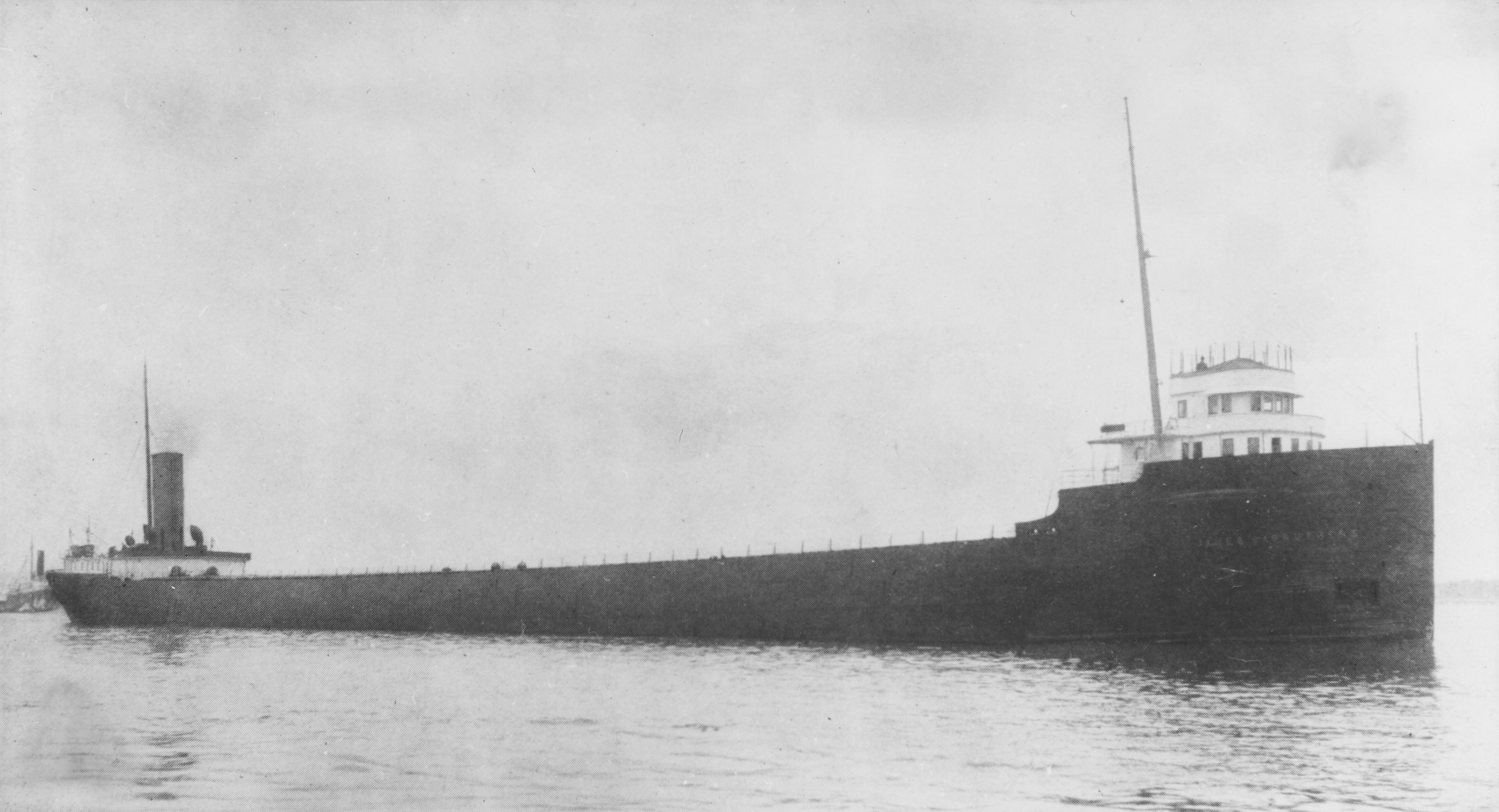
"James Carruthers"

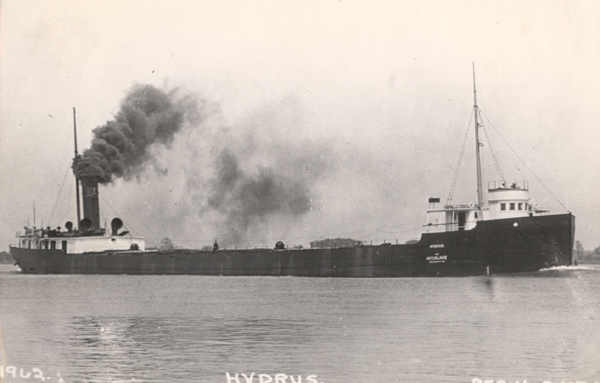
"Hydrus"

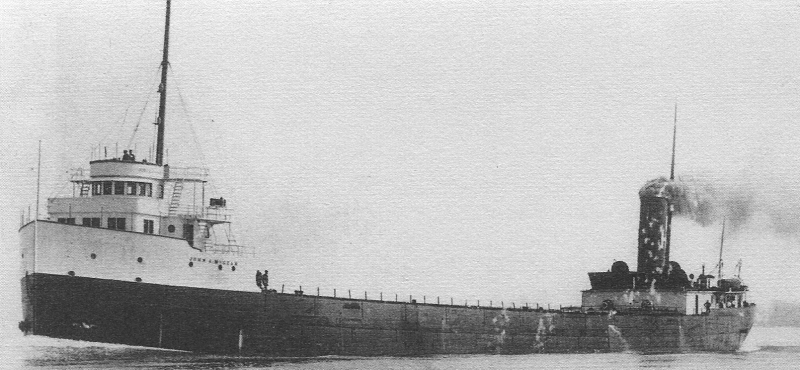
"John A McGean"

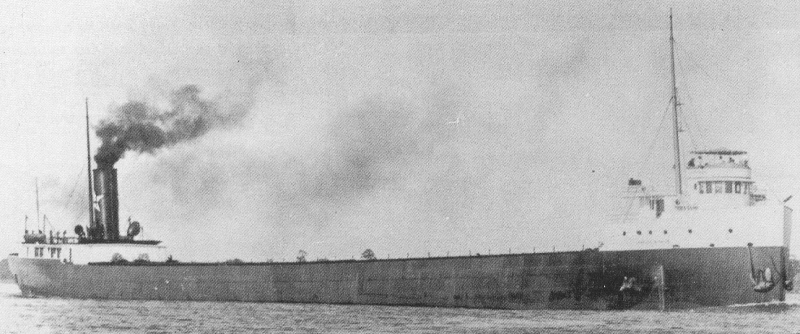
"Charles S Price"

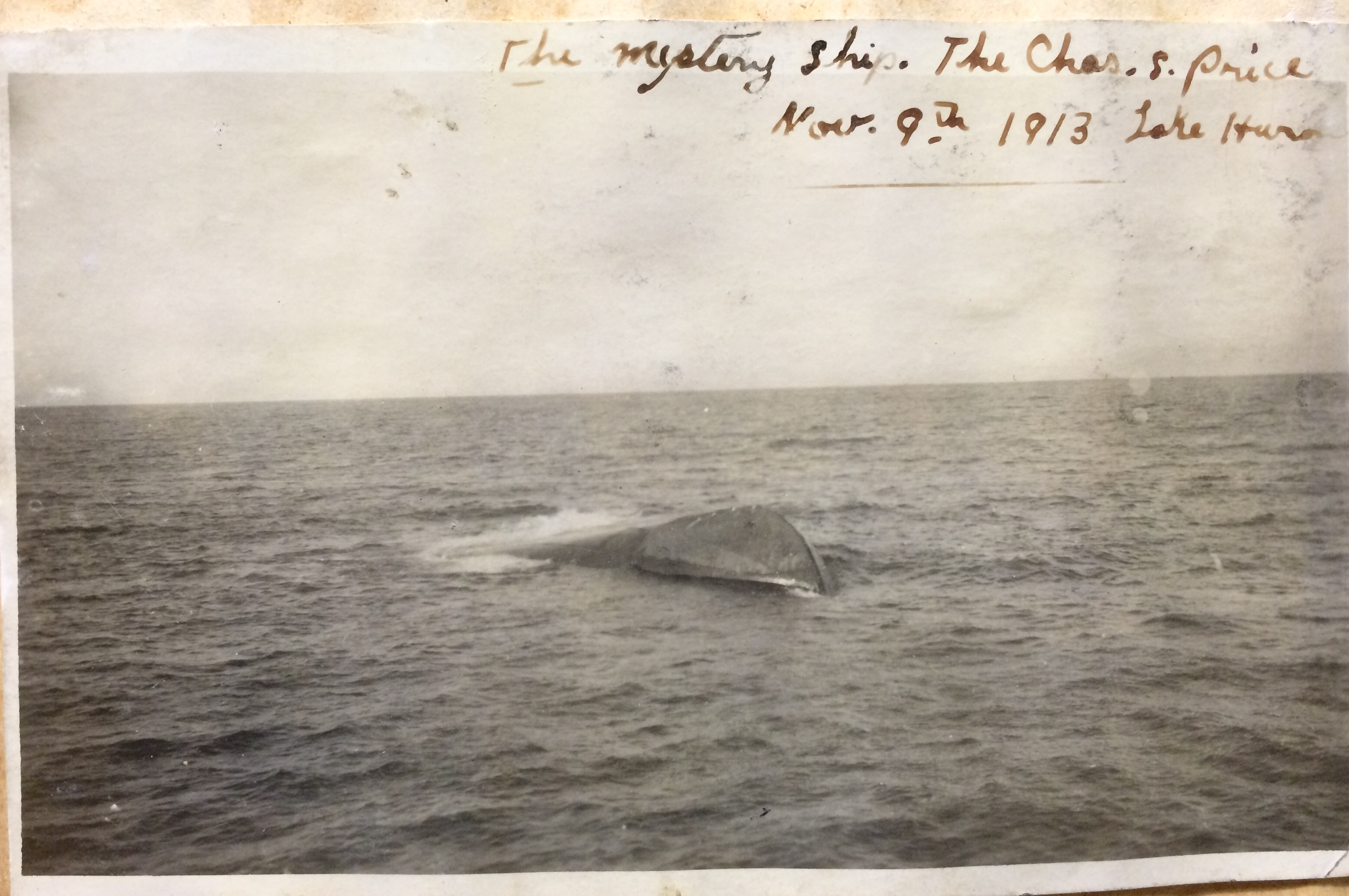
"Charles S Price" wreckage

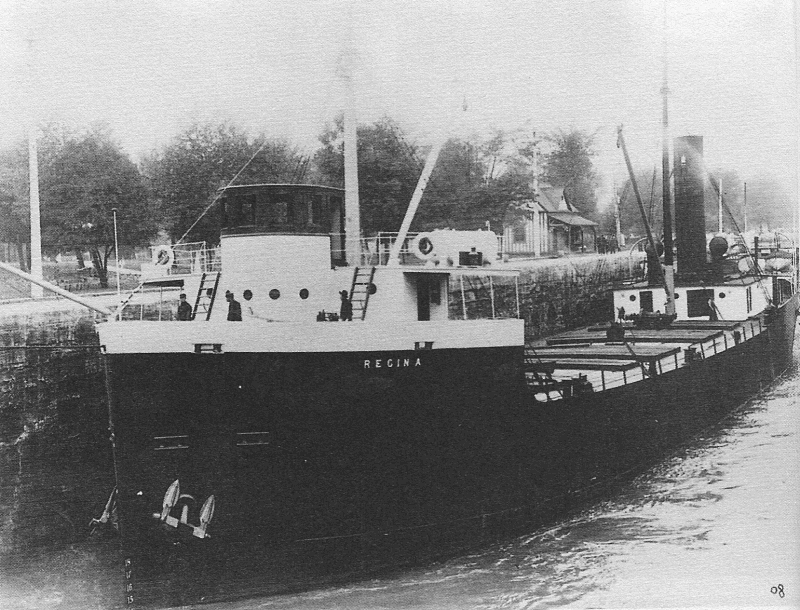
"Regina"

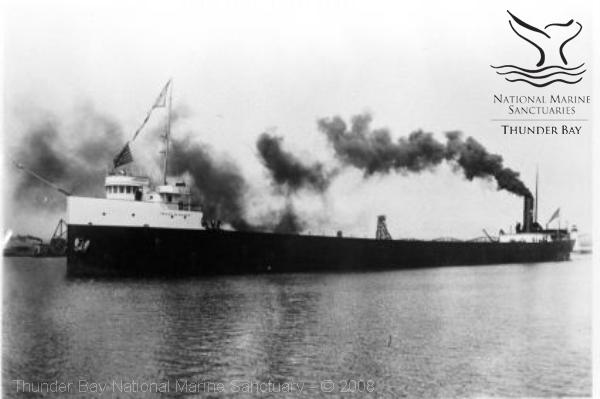
"Isaac M Scott"

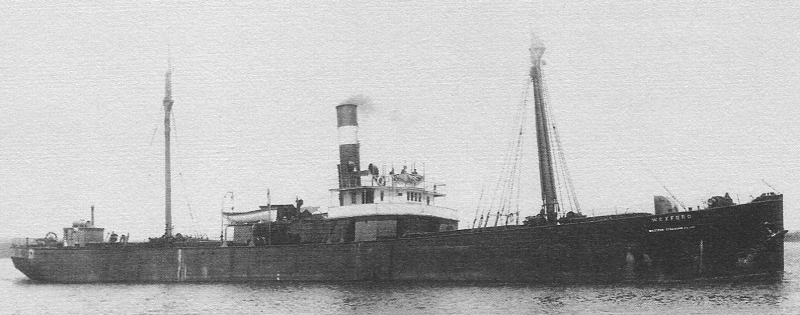
"Wexford"

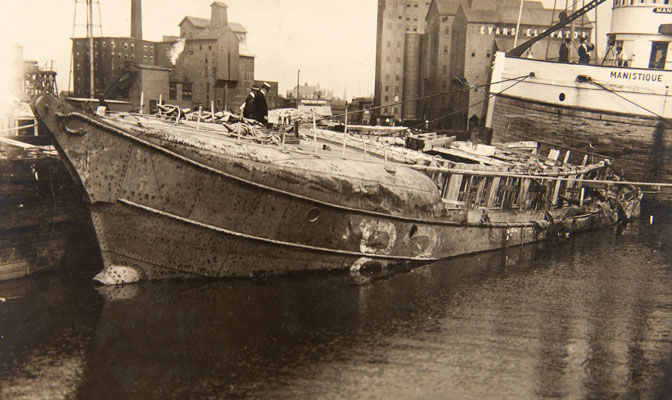
"Lightship LV-82" salvaged

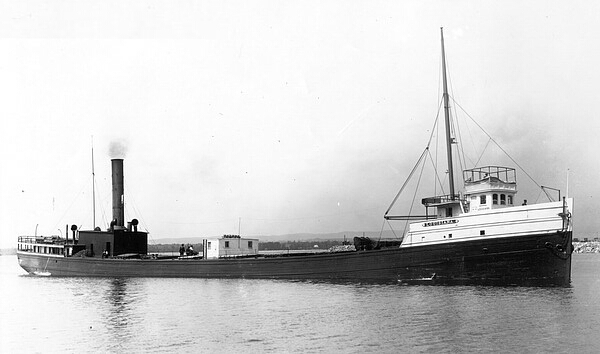
"Louisiana"

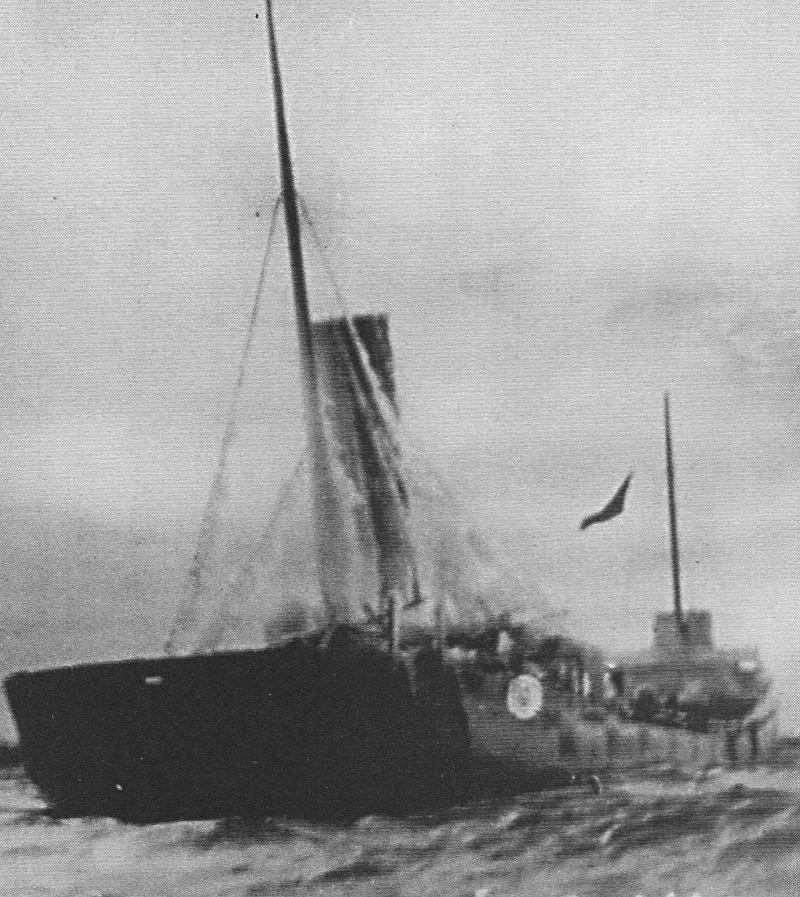
"L.C. Waldo" Aground

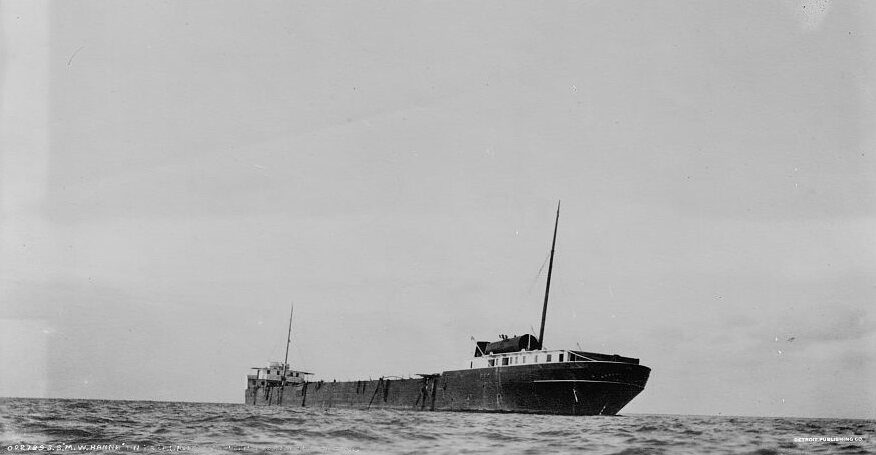
"Howard M Hanna Jr" aground

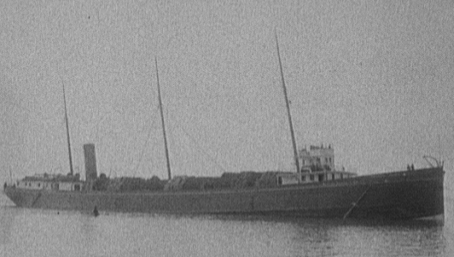
"Northern Queen"

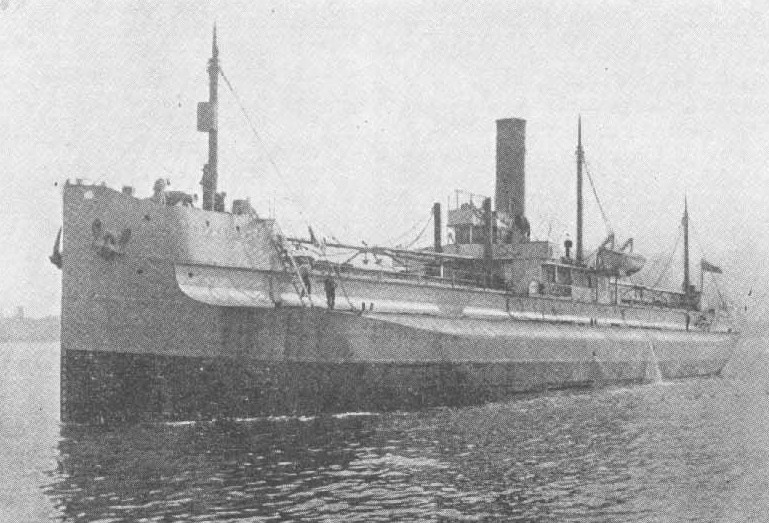
"Turret Chief"

== See also ==
- List of victims of the 1913 Great Lakes storm
- List of shipwrecks
