= Pneumonia (disambiguation) =

Pneumonia is an inflammatory condition of the lung in humans.

This may also refer to:

- Pneumonia (non-human), the condition above but in animals
- Pneumonia front, a rare meteorological phenomenon on western Lake Michigan
- Pneumonia (album), an album by the alternative country band Whiskeytown

== See also ==
- Pneumonic (disambiguation)
