= United States lightship Huron (LV-103) =

1920 lightvessel, now a museum ship in Port Huron, Michigan, United States

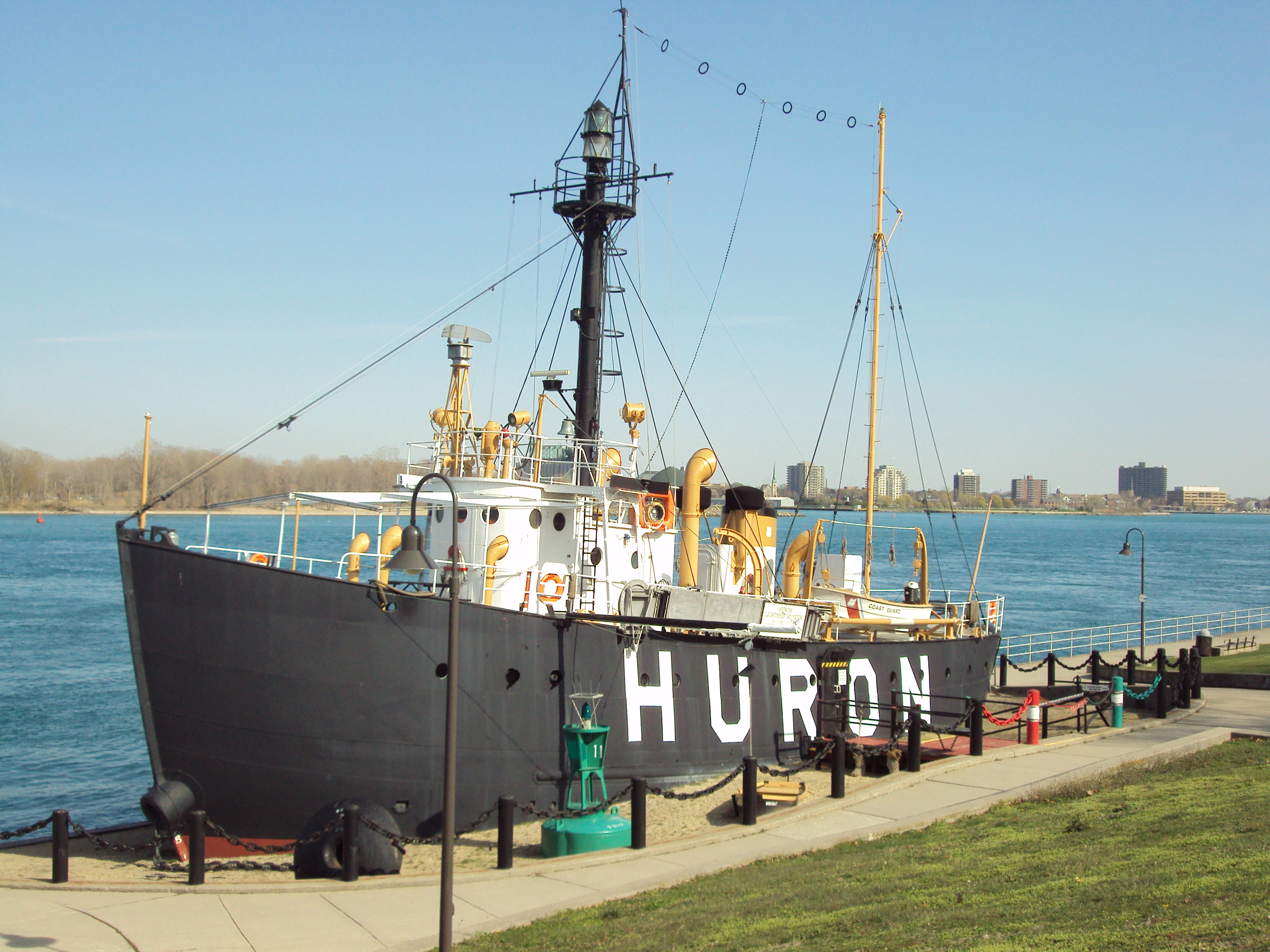
- Huron as she currently appears in Pine Grove Park

History

United States
- Name: LV-103
- Builder: Consolidated Shipbuilding Co
- Laid down: June 5, 1918
- Launched: May 1, 1920
- In service: December 22, 1920
- Out of service: August 25, 1970
- Status: Museum Ship

General characteristics
- Displacement: 312 tons
- Length: 97 ft (30 m)
- Beam: 24 ft (7.3 m)
- Draft: 9 ft 6 in (2.90 m)
- Propulsion: 175 hp steam engine (original equipment)
- Speed: 8 knots (15 km/h; 9.2 mph)
- Crew: 11
- Huron (lightship)
- U.S. National Register of Historic Places
- U.S. National Historic Landmark
- Michigan State Historic Site
- Location within Michigan
- Location: Port Huron, Michigan
- Coordinates: 42°59′21″N 82°25′36″W
- Built: 1918
- Architect: Consolidated Shipbuilding Co.
- NRHP reference No.: 76001974

Significant dates
- Added to NRHP: 12 July 1976
- Designated NHL: 20 December 1989

The United States lightship Huron (LV-103) is a lightvessel that was launched in 1920. She is now a museum ship moored in Pine Grove Park, Port Huron, St. Clair County, Michigan.

== Great Lakes lightships ==
Huron is one of many lightvessels that were moored on the waters of the Great Lakes.

In 1832 the first lightship on the Great Lakes was placed at Waugoshance Shoal. That wooden light ship was the Lois McLain. In 1851 she was replaced by the Waugoshance Light, which is at one of the most hazardous areas near the Straits of Mackinac, Michigan.

In Lake Huron, Huron was the third ship to be placed at Corsica Shoals, a station established in 1893, replacing a gas buoy that was "somewhat ineffective". Three vessels bore the designation of 'Huron Lightship' from 1893 to 1970. The first was Lightship No. 61, a wooden-hulled ship, painted red with white lettering saying "Corsica Shoals" on her sides. Lightship No. 61 served from September 1893 until 1921. She was lost during the November Great Lakes Storm of 1913, which claimed at least 12 ships and over 250 lives, when she was torn from her moorings and forced onto Point Edward on the Canadian shore. The grounding of Lightship No. 61 was a contributing factor in the loss of the Matthew Andrews at Corsica Shoals. In any event, she was reclaimed and repaired, and remained in service until 1920, when she was retired and sold at auction.

In the same storm, Lightship Buffalo (LV-82) foundered near Buffalo in Lake Erie, with the loss of six lives. See Shipwrecks of the 1913 Great Lakes storm and List of victims of the 1913 Great Lakes storm. Buffalo was salvaged and saw service with the Coast Guard until 1936.

In 1921, Lightship No. 61 was replaced by Lightship No. 96, the first vessel to actually be called Huron Lightship.

In 1925, there were ten lightvessels on the Great Lakes. Fifteen years later, only Huron remained.

A list of Great Lakes lightvessel assignments is available.

== Lightship No. 103 construction and service ==
Huron was built by the Consolidated Shipbuilding Company in Morris Heights, New York. Her keel was laid in 1918 and completed at a cost of $147,428. At 96.5 feet (29.4 m) long, 24 feet (7.3 m) in the beam, drawing 9.5 feet (2.9 m), and weighing 312 tons, Ship #103 was powered by a single compound reciprocating steam engine, driven by two coal-fired Scotch boilers. They put out 175 horsepower (130 kW).

Commissioned in 1921 as Lightship Number 103, she operated primarily in southern Lake Huron near Port Huron and the mouth of the St. Clair River. Huron spent the 1924, 1925, 1926 and 1929 seasons lighting Grays Reef. She was assigned in 1934 and 1935 seasons to the North Manitou Shoal. In 1935 she was transferred to the Eleventh District for one year, seeing duty as a relief ship. In 1935, Huron was repainted black with "Huron" on her sides, and transferred to Corsica Shoals, approximately 6 miles (9.7 km) north of the Blue Water Bridge (connecting Port Huron and Sarnia, Ontario, Canada.)

Huron was equipped with one acetylene lens lantern, 300 millimetres (12 in), a 10 in (250 mm) steam whistle fog horn, and a hand-operated bell.

After 1945 as Huron, she was the only lightship that was painted black.

In 1949, she was refitted to diesel power with twin six-cylinder GM 6-71 engines at the Defoe Shipbuilding Company of West Bay City, Michigan. The cost was $168,000. After this conversion, her top speed was 9 knots (17 km/h; 10 mph).

On 7 May 1958, Seaman Robert Gullickson, U.S. Coast Guard, perished when a wave swamped a tender from Huron Lightship that he was aboard. He is memorialized on the ship, as he was the only casualty during her many years of service.

On August 20, 1970, she weighed her anchor the last time from Corsica Shoal. She was decommissioned at Detroit on August 25. Upon decommissioning, she was replaced by an unmanned warning buoy light. Ownership of Huron was transferred to the City of Port Huron the following June.

== Retirement, honors and museum service ==
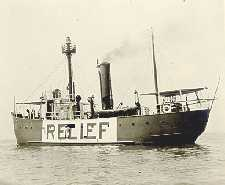
Huron, c. 1922

The following honors have been indicated:

- National Register of Historic Places, listed 12 July 1976
- National Historic Landmark, listed 20 December 1989
- State Register, listed 17 May 1973
- State Historical Marker, erected 1973.

Commissioned in 1921, the Huron began service as a relief vessel for other Great Lakes lightships. She is ninety-seven feet long, twenty-four feet in beam, and carried a crew of eleven. On clear nights her beacon could be seen for fourteen miles (23 km). After serving in northern Lake Michigan, the Huron was assigned to the Corsica Shoals in 1935. These shallow waters, six miles (9.7 km) north of Port Huron, were the scene of frequent groundings by lake freighters in the late nineteenth century. A lightship station had been established there in 1893, since the manned ships were more reliable than lighted buoys. After 1940 the Huron was the only lightship on the Great Lakes. Retired from Coast Guard Service in 1970, she was presented to the City of Port Huron in 1971.

— State historical marker

The ship is exceptionally well-preserved, and has an operable light and fog horn still on board. Her twin General Motors diesel engines are fully operational, having been brought back to life through the efforts of volunteer mechanics. Amateur radio station NM8GS named the "NMGS Radio Group" operates from her. NM8GS is a take on the original visual and radio navy call sign, NMGS, the ship held when it was in operation. She is officially designated as Amateur Radio Lighthouse Society No. USA-394.

The engines suffered damage as the ship awaited transfer to state ownership. The pistons and cylinders were restored through the contributions and efforts of local companies and volunteers. They powered every part of the ship, from lighting to fog horn. To keep them in working order, they are operated every thirty days.

She was the last of her kind. It is the smallest surviving lightship, and is representative of the 96-foot (29 m) class.

== See also ==
- Lighthouses in the United States
- Lightvessels in the United States
- List of U.S. National Historic Landmark ships, shipwrecks, and shipyards
