= Plymouth (schooner barge) =

American Schooner barge that sank in Lake Michigan

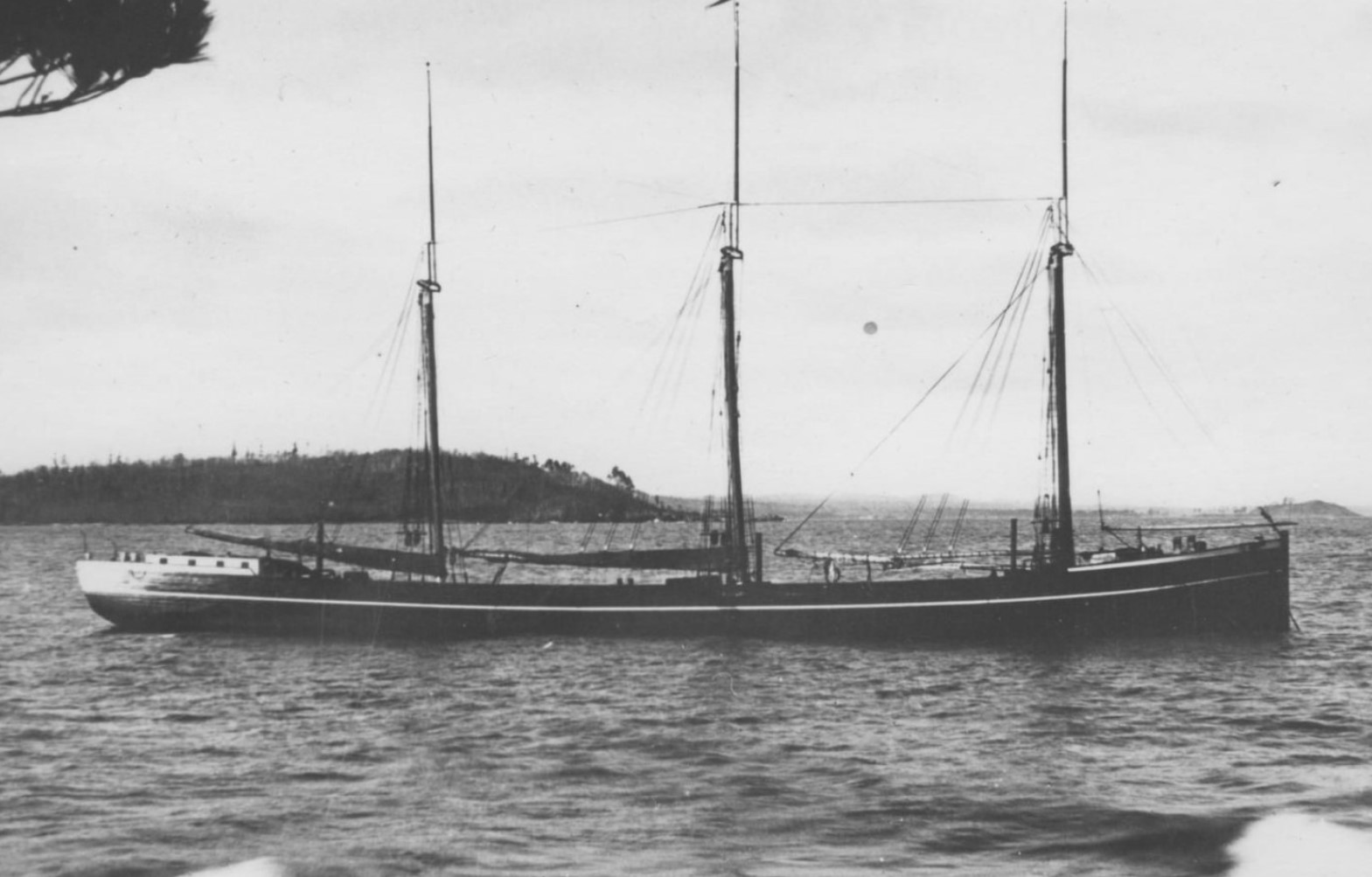
- Plymouth after her conversion into a schooner

History

United States
- Name: (United States) Plymouth
- Owner: Sternberg & Co. (1854-1856); Western Transportation Co. (1856-1882); Coatsworth (1882-1885); Baker William et al (1885-1888); Reid Wrecking Co. (1888-1890); Young W.D. (1890-1902); Gray Transportation Co. (1905-1909); McTigue Margaret (1909-1911); Hubel Co. (1911-1912); Scott Lumber Co. (1912-1913)
- Port of registry: Menominee, Michigan, United States
- Builder: Stephenson & Lafrinier
- Yard number: 19621
- Launched: 7 March 1854
- Completed: 8 May 1854
- Acquired: 8 May 1854
- Maiden voyage: 12 May 1854
- In service: 12 May 1854
- Out of service: 11 November 1913
- Fate: Sunk in Great Lakes Storm of 1913

General characteristics
- Class & type: Cargo Steamer/Schooner barge
- Tonnage: 846 GRT
- Length: 64.8 m (213 ft)
- Beam: 9.9 m (32 ft)
- Depth: 3.7 m (12 ft)
- Decks: 1
- Installed power: High pressure (including HPNC) engine (until 1884)
- Propulsion: Screw propeller and 1 mast (converted in 1884 to 3 mast schooner)
- Crew: 7
- Notes: Captain Alex Larson

Plymouth was an American Schooner barge that sank during the Great Lakes Storm of 1913 in Lake Michigan, near St. Martins Island at the mouth of Green Bay, while she was being towed by the tug James H. Martin from Menominee, Michigan, United States, to Lake Huron.

== Construction and description ==
Plymouth was built as a steamship in 1854 at the Stephenson & Lafrinier shipyard in Ohio City, Ohio, United States and launched on 7 March 1854. She was completed on 8 May 1854. The vessel served from 12 May 1854 until 1884 as a steamer before being converted into a 3 masted schooner. The ship was 64.8 metres (212 ft 7 in) long, with a beam of 9.9 metres (32 ft 6 in) and a draft of 3.7 metres (12 ft 2 in). The ship was assessed at 846 gross register tons (GRT). She had a high pressure (including HPNC) engine, driving a single screw propeller until 1884.

== Early career and incidents ==
Plymouth started her career as a Cargo steamer on the great lakes on 12 May 1854, but the ship was quickly plagued by a series of accidents. The first of these occurred on 29 October 1855 when Plymouth ran on a reef near Racine, Wisconsin on Lake Michigan, but she managed to be refloated and returned to service. A more serious accident occurred nearly a year later on 20 September 1856 when Plymouth collided with the Oswego (New York) bound 3 masted barge Colonel E. Camp near the Manitou Islands, North and South, in Lake Michigan. The barge sank in a few minutes, but the number of casualties or survivors are unknown. The first reported deadly incident occurred on 2 September 1859 when Plymouth was caught in a gale off Point Aux Barques in Lake Michigan, resulting in the death of one crewmate.

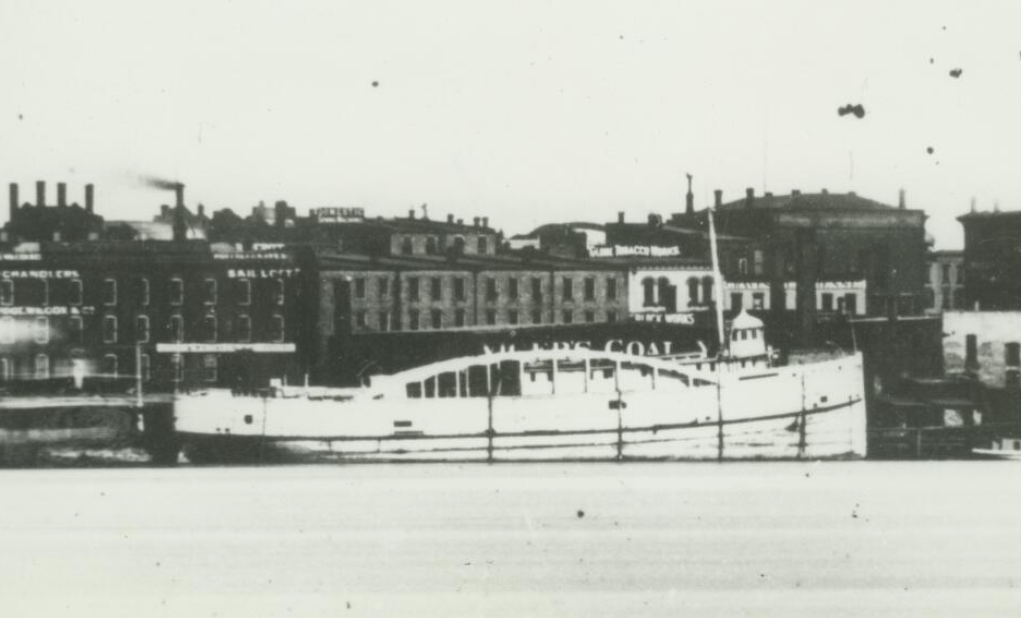
Plymouth in use as a steamer

During the American Civil War in November 1862, Plymouth ran ashore again, this time near Long Point, Ontario in Lake Erie. The ship was refloated on 27 December 1862 and returned to service. Following the Civil War, Plymouth managed to retain a better safety record, but the aging ship had to undergo numerous repairs including being refitted with a new engine in 1877. The ship entered the lumber trade in 1880 and was converted to a 3 masted schooner in 1884. After her conversion she was grounded two more times, first on 24 October 1887 near Presque Isle, Wisconsin in Lake Superior, being refloated on 13 August. With the second time being on 12 November 1888 near Marquette, Michigan in Lake Superior. Her final incident occurred on 25 June 1898 when she collided with a railroad bridge over the Welland Canal. Surprisingly despite her old age, the ship gained a small bit of fame when she was photographed while carrying the largest load of seven foot cedar posts (100,000 in total) on the Menominee River in 1912.

== Great Lakes Storm of 1913 and sinking ==
On 8 November 1913, Plymouth, empty without cargo, was being towed by the tug James H. Martin from Menominee, Michigan, United States to Lake Huron. While sailing through Lake Michigan, both ships were unaware that they were heading straight into the path of the deadliest storm in the Great Lakes history. Captain Alex Larson, a lumber inspector was in command of the Plymouth at the time, and was joined by six more crewmen and a U.S. marshal, named Christopher Keenan, who was on board because the ship was the subject of several lawsuits.

While underway, the storm began to grow in intensity and soon both ships were struggling in the worsening conditions. Noticing that the tug and barge couldn't make headway against the mounting waves, with the risk of both ships sinking if they stayed together, James H. Martin's captain decided to guide Plymouth to "the safest waters he could find". This place appeared to be at Gull Island in St. Martin's Passage near St. Martins Island at the mouth of Green Bay. When both ships reached the location, the tug's captain cut the towing line and headed into open water to seek shelter at Point Detour 12 miles (19 km) away. Plymouth stayed behind and dropped her anchor intending to sit out the storm along with everyone onboard until the tug returned.

When the Martin returned to the site several days after abandoning Plymouth, they discovered that the ship had disappeared. A note from Keenan was discovered in a bottle which had washed up 11 days after Plymouth had dropped anchor at Gull Island which confirmed that the ship had sunk with all hands after withstanding the full force of the storm for over 40 hours. The message read: "Dear wife and Children. We were left up here in Lake Michigan by McKinnon, captain James H. Martin tug, at anchor. He went away and never said goodbye or anything to us. Lost one man yesterday. We have been out in storm forty hours. Goodbye dear ones, I might see you in Heaven. Pray for me. / Chris K. / P.S. I felt so bad I had another man write for me. Huebel owes thirty-five dollars so you can get it .Goodbye forever."

Plymouth was one of twelve vessels lost during the Great Lakes Storm of 1913. A storm described in the book: Lore of the Lakes, as "The most disastrous that has ever swept our Great Lakes, both from loss of life and property this unprecedented." The storm of heavy snow, bitter cold winds and frightening high waves took the lives of an estimated 235 mariners, with Plymouth being the only ship lost on Lake Michigan with fatalities.

== Wreck ==
Plymouth is one of two vessels that currently have not been located, of the twelve that foundered during the Great Lakes Storm of 1913. The other being SS Leafield that sank in Lake Superior. A wreck, first believed to be that of Plymouth, was found in 15 metres (49 ft 3 in) of water, 460 metres (1,509 ft 2 in) off Poverty Island, Michigan on 21 April 1984. It has since been ruled out as the Plymouth and is most likely the Erastus Corning.

== In literature ==
The Plymouth wreck appears as a major plot point during the climax of the novel A Death in Door County by Annelise Ryan.
