= November gale =

Late autumn wind on the Great Lakes

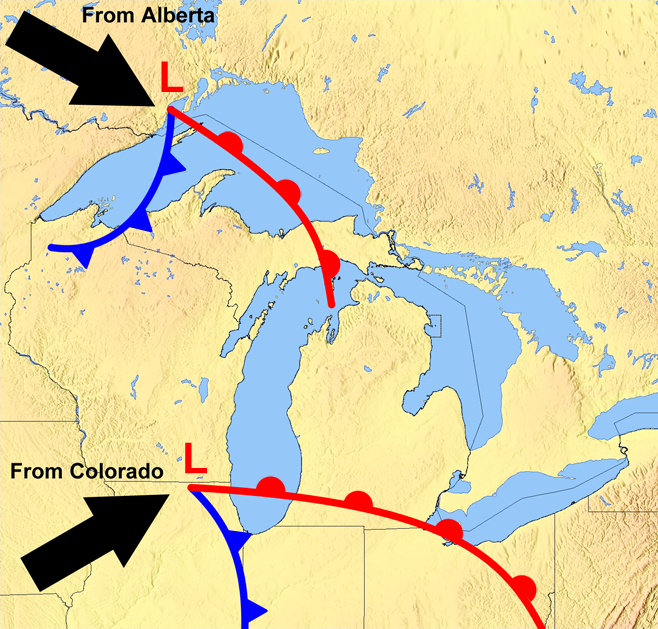
Typical November Witch weather pattern

November gale, the Witch of November, or November Witch, refers to the strong winds that frequently blow across the Great Lakes in autumn. The "witches" are caused by intense low atmospheric pressure over the Great Lakes pulling cold Canadian/Arctic air from the north or northwest and warm Gulf of Mexico air from the south. When these cold and warm air masses collide, they can result in hurricane-force winds that stir up large waves on the lakes.

Gordon Lightfoot's song "The Wreck of the Edmund Fitzgerald" makes reference to the Witch of November: the storm that wrecked the Edmund Fitzgerald was 978 mbar, equivalent to a borderline Category 2 hurricane. Similar witches have caused numerous shipwrecks over the years. Another storm that hit in November 1998 was 967 mbar, equivalent to a Category 2 hurricane. A still stronger storm, of October 2010, brought Minnesota and Wisconsin record low barometric pressures of, respectively, 954.96 and 961.06 mbar (both equivalent to a Category 3 hurricane) and lashed Duluth with 81 mph wind gusts and 19-foot seas during the night of October 26–27, 2010.

== Etymology ==
November gale is the formally accepted name of the weather phenomenon. "Witch of November" and its variations are historical maritime and meteorological slang. Derivative names include "Witch Storm", "November Witch", and "Witch gale". November is known in the Great Lakes region as the "month of storms".

"Witch" is mythologic and descriptive of the gales. Descriptors such as "wailing" and "brewing" frequently accompany the phrase. A weather textbook from 1998 says: "That so many ships lay buried beneath the waters of the Lakes is not as much a mythological mystery as a combination of circumstances—both economic and meteorologic—that combine to make the Witch of November as real to the mariners of the upper Midwest as the Mighty Serpent of the Lakes was to the Iroquois and Algonquin."

== Environmental effects ==
Storms attributed to November gales have intensified wildfires with the speed of the wind, caused power outages for more than 200,000 households at a time, and even caused rivers to "run backwards" from wind forcing lake waves into the mouths of rivers. When blizzards follow a November gale, they are anticipated to produce massive amounts of precipitation and wind and be highly damaging to infrastructure and environment. A large portion of the deaths and shipwrecks on Lake Superior and other Great Lakes are attributed to November Witches.

== Notable storms ==
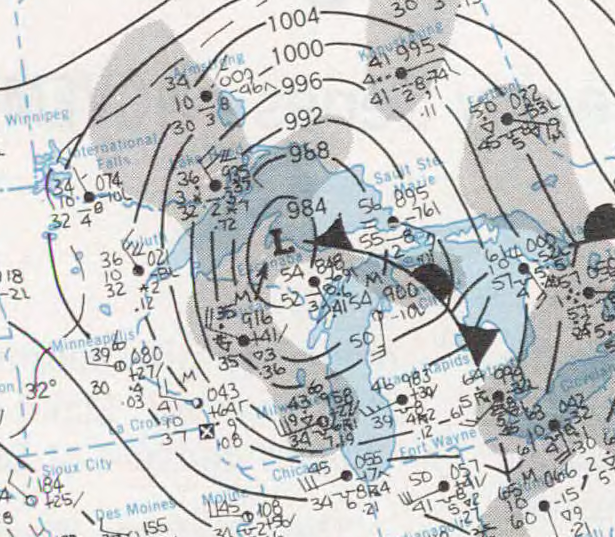
Weather map of the 1975 Witch that sank the SS Edmund Fitzgerald

- The October 2010 North American storm complex brought record low pressures and snow accumulation across the Great Lakes region and the greater U.S. It dissipated early November.
- The SS Edmund Fitzgerald sank in a storm November 10, 1975, while carrying taconite across Lake Superior to a port in Detroit.
- The Great Lakes Storm of 1913 (historically referred to as the "Big Blow", the "Freshwater Fury", and the "White Hurricane") was a blizzard with hurricane-force winds that devastated the Great Lakes region on November 7–10, 1913. The storm was most powerful on November 9, battering and overturning ships on four of the five Great Lakes, particularly Lake Huron.
- The Mataafa Storm occurred on November 27–28, 1905. The system moved across the region with moderate depth on November 26 and November 27, then east-northeastward across the Great Lakes on November 28. Fresh east winds were forecast for the afternoon and evening of November 27, with storm warnings in effect by the morning of November 28. Storm-force winds and heavy snows accompanied the cyclone's passage. The storm, named after the steamship Mataafa, ended up destroying or damaging about 29 vessels, killing 36 seamen, and causing shipping losses of US$ 3.6 million ($137 million in 2026 dollars) on Lake Superior.

== In popular culture ==
- Arguably the best known use of the phrase is from Gordon Lightfoot's folk song "The Wreck of the Edmund Fitzgerald": "'Twas the witch of November come stealin'" and "Superior, they said, never gives up her dead / When the gales of November come early"
- In 2020 Ohio brewery Earnest Brew Works released a blackberry sour ale named "Gales of November" in honor of the downed SS Edmund Fitzgerald, with a re-release due to popular demand in 2022.
- The Lake Superior Maritime Visitor Center holds a benefit festival each year known as the Gales of November.

== See also ==
- List of storms on the Great Lakes
- Mishipeshu
- Pneumonia front
