= SS Henry B. Smith =

Steel-hulled lake freighter

Coordinates: 46.914°N 87.333°W

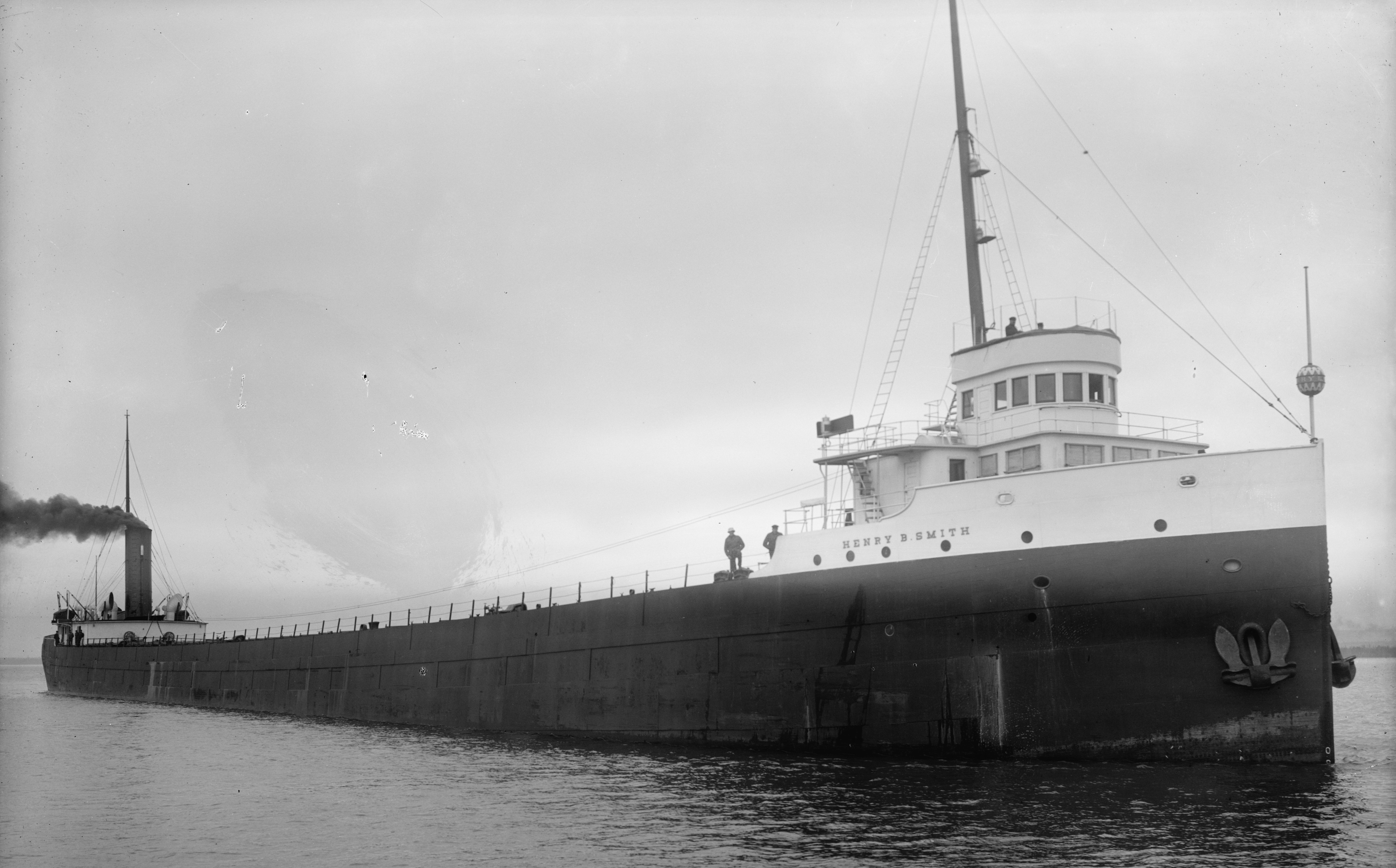
- Henry B. Smith

History

United States
- Name: Henry B. Smith
- Operator: Acme Transit Company; (William A. Hawgood, Mgr.); Cleveland, Ohio
- Builder: American Ship Building Company; Lorain, Ohio
- Yard number: 343
- Launched: May 2, 1906
- Completed: May 20, 1906
- Fate: Foundered and sunk November 10, 1913
- Notes: United States Registry #203143

General characteristics
- Type: Bulk freighter
- Tonnage: 6631 gross; 5229 net
- Length: 545 ft (166 m) LOA; 525 ft (160 m) LBP
- Beam: 55 ft (17 m)
- Height: 31 ft (9.4 m)
- Installed power: 2 x Scotch marine boilers
- Propulsion: Triple expansion steam engine
- Crew: 25

SS Henry B. Smith was a steel-hulled lake freighter built in 1906 by the American Ship Building Company at Lorain, Ohio USA. The steamship was owned by the Acme Transit Company of Lorain, Ohio, under the management of William A. Hawgood. The hull number was 343 and the registration number was US203143.

Henry B. Smith was 545 ft (166 m) in length, 55 ft (17 m) in width, and 31 ft (9.4 m) in height. The gross tonnage for the vessel was 6,631, and the net tonnage was 5,229. The engine was a triple-expansion type. She was named for Henry B. Smith (1849-1918), a prominent lumberman who was the managing owner of the Ludington Woodenware Company in Ludington, Michigan.

The ship foundered and was lost in Lake Superior near Marquette, Michigan, on 9 or 10 November 1913 during the Great Lakes Storm of 1913. She was carrying a load of iron ore at the time of her sinking. All 25 crew members died in the sinking, and only two bodies were retrieved from the lake.

The wreck was discovered in 2013, one hundred years after she disappeared.

== Last voyage ==
Smith arrived at Marquette on November 6 to take on iron ore. Over the next two days a southwest gale swept over Lake Superior, dropping the temperature to 24 °F (13 °C). The cold weather caused the ore to freeze inside the hopper cars, requiring men to knock the material loose by hand. This resulted in a loading delay for Smith. Captain James Owen had been plagued by misfortunes all year that had resulted in Smith being delayed or late for its destinations. Rumors abounded, then and now, that the owners of the boat made it clear to Owen that he better make this last trip on time, or else.

At approximately 5 p.m. on November 9, Smith was loaded with the final car of iron ore. Immediately afterwards, Smith backed away from the loading dock and headed out, the crew apparently hoping to take advantage of a brief lull in the storm. Fierce winds picked up almost as soon as the ship left Marquette. Observers from shore saw deckhands attempting to close the ship's 32 hatches, a process which normally took hours. After twenty minutes, the full force of the storm hit. Witnesses saw Smith turn to port, possibly seeking shelter behind Keweenaw Point, but the ship was then lost from view. Debris from the ship was found two days later along the beaches of Chocolay Bay, Shot Point, and Laughing Fish Point.

Only two bodies were ever recovered. Second Cook H.R. Haskin was found floating 50 mi (80 km) west of Whitefish Point a few days after the sinking. Third Engineer John Gallagher's skeleton was found on Ile Parisienne in the spring of 1914.

A note in a bottle, allegedly from Smith, was found in June 1914. In it, the author claimed the ship had broken in two 12 mi (19 km) east of Marquette. After a long debate, the boat's owners decided the note was a phony; it was dated 12 November, while Smith sank either on the 9th or the early morning hours of the 10th.

== Wreck located in 2013 ==
The wreck was located in May 2013 by shipwreck hunters. The ship lies in 535 feet (163 m) of water, 30 mi (48 km) north of Marquette. Video the following month confirmed this wreck to be Henry B. Smith.

The Smith is upright and mostly intact, broken in two near the middle and her cargo scattered on the lake bottom. The ship's pilothouse and forward mast are in place on the bow while her stern's cabin's imploded and collapsed. Her name is fully legible on her stern, which led to the confirmation of her identity at the time of discovery.
