= SS Leafield =

Canadian steel-hulled cargo ship that sank in Lake Superior

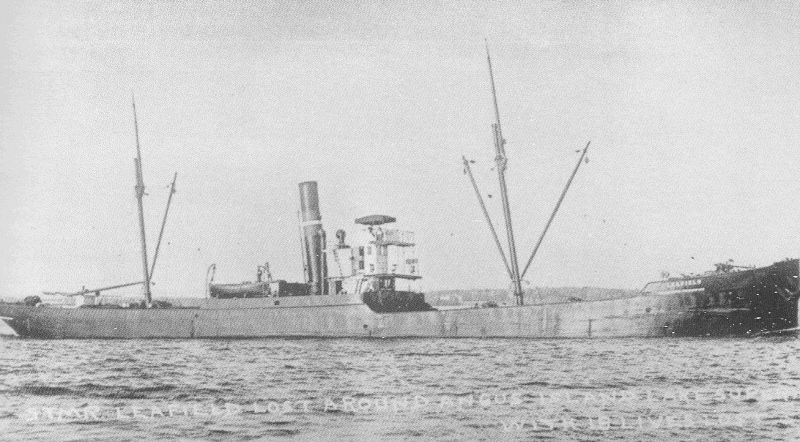

History

Canada
- Name: SS Leafield
- Operator: Algoma Central Steamship Co. 1900s
- Ordered: 1890-1891
- Builder: Strand Stepway Company, Sunderland, England
- Laid down: 1891?
- Launched: 1892
- Completed: 1892
- Acquired: Algoma Steamship Co. 1900
- In service: 1893
- Out of service: 1913
- Fate: Sank Great Storm of November, 1913

General characteristics
- Tonnage: 1,454 GRT
- Length: 248 feet (76 m), 249 feet (76 m), or 269 feet (82 m) (sources vary)
- Beam: 35 feet 6 inches (10.82 m)
- Height: 16 feet 6 inches (5.03 m)
- Depth: 16 feet (4.9 m)

SS Leafield was a British-Canadian steel-hulled cargo ship built by the Strand Stepway Company in Sunderland, England, in 1892. Originally registered in Newcastle upon Tyne, England, she was sold by the 1900s to the Algoma Steamship Line and brought to Canada, where she operated on the Great Lakes, hauling varying cargoes, including coal, grain, and iron ore.

On May 11th of 1901, the ship suffered damages due to a fire in her engine room, sometime later she ran aground in the St. Clair flats, and on July 6th, two months later, she struck a pier in the Welland Canal.

During a storm on Lake Erie, she was towing the schooner barge J.J Barlum west toward Cleveland Ohio, while making for port, she began to run out of coal, the crew cut the line between the ship and barge and she headed for port to restock her fuel, later headed back out to pick up the barge and bring her in safely.

On May 15th, 1906, she was the first ship to carry Iron Ore from Escanaba north through the Soo Locks.

On the night of the 17th of August 1912, Leafield, under Captain Charles Baker, was carrying ore to Midland, Ontario, Canada, when she ran aground on a rocky islet in Georgian Bay on Lonely Island, near Beausoleil Island, Ontario. The incident tore a hole 140 feet (43 m) long and 15 feet (4.6 m) wide in her bottom. Salvage and repairs cost $15,000, and the ship was out of service for two months.

During the shipping season in 1913, Leafield was hauling steel rails, bound for present day Thunder Bay, when she sank in deep water in Lake Superior, probably off the Angus Islands, about 14 miles (23 km) southeast of Ft. William, Port Arthur, Ontario during the Great Lakes storm of 1913. Her entire crew, including Captain Baker were lost. A search found not much of a trace of the ship or crew. As of 2026, Leafield's wreck has not been located.

There aren't many reports on the ship since she hadn't and hasn't been found, sources say 18 crewmen were aboard when she was lost, other ones say about 26 were aboard, and a report from a passenger vessel crew claimed to have saw her sink during the storm, a message in a bottle alleged from the ship was likely a hoax as no bodies were ever recovered.

A source says Captain Baker's body was the only body recovered, though that isn't definitive.

The ship's date of loss isn't proven, some say she was lost on the November 7th, others claim on November 9th as the storm reached its ultimate strength by that midnight.
