= SS Wexford =

Freighter shipwreck and dive site in lake Huron

Coordinates: 43°25′N 81°55′W

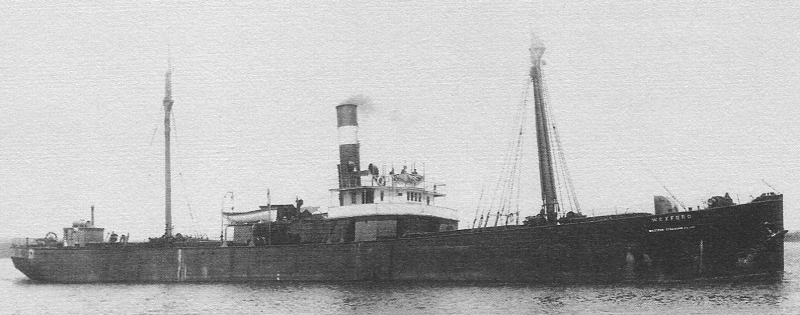

History

United Kingdom
- Name: SS Wexford
- Operator: R.M. Hudson & Son (1883–1898); N. Dubuisson (1898–1903); Western Steamship Company (1903–1913)
- Builder: William Doxford & Sons, Sunderland
- Yard number: 00145
- Launched: 24 March 1883
- Completed: 1883
- Fate: Foundered on 9 November 1913

General characteristics
- Tonnage: 2,077 GRT; 1,354 NRT
- Length: 250 ft (76 m)
- Beam: 40 ft (12 m)
- Draught: 17 ft (5.2 m)
- Crew: 17–24

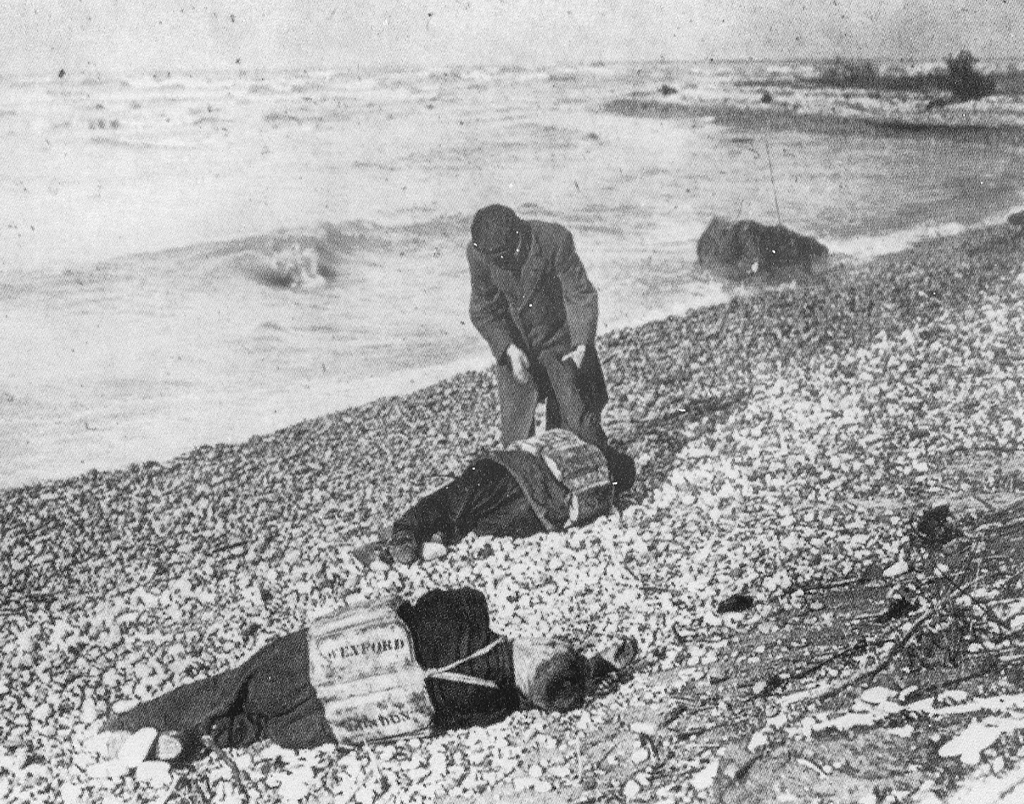
Bodies from Wexford washed ashore near Goderich, Ontario, Canada.

SS Wexford was a steel-hulled, propeller-driven, cargo ship built by William Doxford & Sons. at Sunderland, Great Britain in 1883. The official number for Wexford was 87342 with the hull number 00145. The ship was lost on Lake Huron with all hands on 9 November 1913 during the Great Lakes storm of 1913. Sources cite conflicting numbers for crew lost with 17 to 24 crew being listed. Her cargo at the time of loss was 96,000 bushels of wheat. The wreck was discovered 25 August 2000 sitting intact and upright in 75 feet (23 m) of water on the lake bottom. A copper wreath was placed on the wreck to honor the crew of the 100th Anniversary of The Great Storm of 1913.

== Ownership ==
Wexford was owned by a number of parties during her service life. Wexford was renamed Elise from 1898 to 1903. She was renamed Wexford in 1903. At the time of the sinking the ship was owned by the Western Steamship Company.
