= Great Lakes Storm of 1913 =

Winter storm in North America

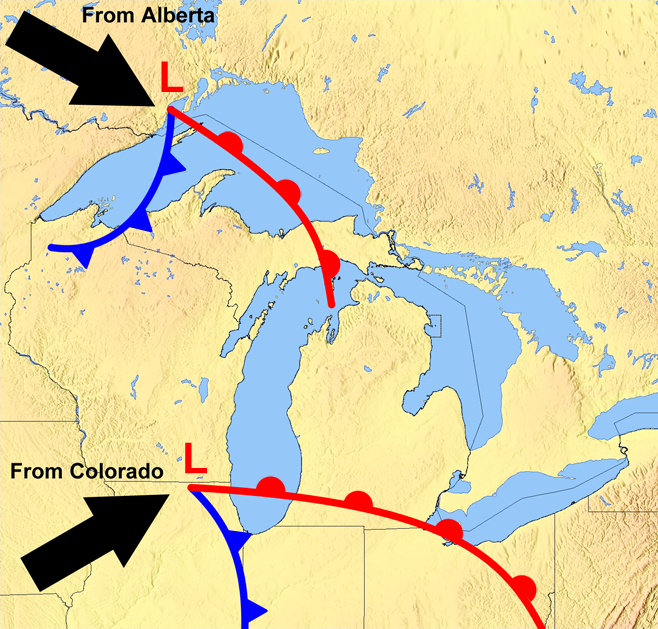
- A surface analysis map showing the convergence of two systems to form a typical November gale

Meteorological history
- Formed: November 6, 1913
- Dissipated: November 11, 1913

Category 4 "Crippling" blizzard
- Regional snowfall index: 16.09 (NOAA)
- Highest gusts: 90 mph (145 km/h)
- Lowest pressure: 968.5 mbar (hPa); 28.60 inHg
- Max. snowfall: 22 in (56 cm) in Cleveland, Ohio

Overall effects
- Fatalities: 250+
- Areas affected: The Great Lakes Basin in the Midwestern United States and the Canadian province of Ontario

The Great Lakes Storm of 1913, historically referred to as the Big Blow, (Note: Another storm called the "Big Blow" which sank the PS Alpena was on October 15, 1880.) the Freshwater Fury and the White Hurricane, was a blizzard with hurricane-force winds that devastated the Great Lakes region in the Midwestern United States and Southwestern Ontario, Canada, between November 7 and 10, 1913. The storm was at its most powerful on November 9, battering and overturning ships on four of the five Great Lakes, particularly Lake Huron.

With more than 250 people killed, the storm was the deadliest and most destructive natural disaster to hit the Great Lakes in recorded history. Shipping was hard hit; 19 ships were destroyed, and 19 others were stranded. About 68,300 tons of cargo—including coal, iron ore, and grain—were lost. Damages were estimated at nearly $4.8 million ($162 million in 2026). The storm impacted many cities, including Duluth, Minnesota; Chicago, Illinois; and Cleveland, Ohio. Cleveland received 22 in (56 cm) of snow combined with winds up to 79 mph (127 km/h) and was paralyzed for days.

The extratropical cyclone originated when two major storm fronts fueled by the Great Lakes' relatively warm waters—a seasonal process called a "November gale"—converged. It produced wind gusts of 90 mph (140 km/h), waves estimated at over 35 feet (11 m) high, and whiteout snowsqualls. Winds exceeding hurricane-force occurred over four of the lakes for extended periods, creating very large waves. The large size of the lakes provides wind fetches (the length of water over which a given wind has blown without obstruction) of hundreds of miles, allowing huge waves to form. Rogue waves are known to occur on the Great Lakes, including waves reinforced by reflections from the vertical shores of some of the lakes.

The United States Weather Bureau, precursor to the National Weather Service, failed to predict the intensity of the storm, and the process of preparing and communicating predictions was slow. These factors contributed to the storm's destructiveness. The contemporaneous weather forecasters did not have enough data, communications, analysis capability and understanding of atmospheric dynamics to predict the storm. They could not predict wind directions, which is key to the ability of ships to avoid or cope with the effects of storms.

== Background ==
The water in the five Great Lakes holds heat that allows them to remain relatively warm late into the year and postpones the cooling and first frosts in the region. During the autumn, two major weather tracks converge over the area. Cold, dry air moves south and southeast from northern Canada as an Alberta clipper, while warm, moist air moves north and northeast from the Gulf of Mexico along the lee of the central Rocky Mountains as a Colorado low. The collision of these air masses forms large storm systems in the middle of the North American continent, including the Great Lakes. When the cold air from these storms moves over the lakes, it is warmed by the waters below and picks up a spin. As the cyclonic system continues over the lakes, its power is intensified by the jet stream above and the warm waters below.

The resulting storm, which is commonly called a "November gale" or "November witch", can maintain hurricane-force winds, produce waves over 50 feet (15 m) high and dump significant falls of rain or snow. Fueled by the warm waters, these powerful storms may remain over the Great Lakes for days. November gales have caused several large storms over the Great Lakes, with at least 25 killer storms affecting the region since 1847. During the Mataafa Storm in 1905, 27 wooden vessels were lost. During a November gale in 1975, the giant bulk carrier SS Edmund Fitzgerald sank suddenly without sending a distress signal and with all crew still on board. The large size of the lakes provides fetches of hundreds of miles allowing huge waves to be developed. Their large unobstructed spaces result in wind speeds higher than nearby inland areas. Rogue waves (including a phenomenon named the "Three Sisters") are known to occur on the Great Lakes, including waves reinforced by reflections from the vertical shores of some of the lakes. Waves on the lakes (especially the shallower ones) can be steeper and closer together than on the ocean, allowing less recovery time between waves. Compared to the ocean, the Great Lakes also have less maneuvering "sea room" and closer proximity to shores, making it more difficult for ships to weather storms.

=== Weather forecasting ===
At the time of the storm, the United States Weather Bureau did not have enough data, communications, analysis capability and understanding of atmospheric dynamics to predict or understand the storm. They also were unable to predict wind directions to allow ships to avoid or cope with the storm's conditions. More modern studies of the available information and data from the storm provide better descriptions of its weather mechanisms and treat it as two storms.

Weather forecasters of the time did not have enough data or understanding of atmospheric dynamics to predict or comprehend the events of Sunday November 9. Frontal mechanisms, which were then referred to as "squall lines", were not yet understood. Surface observations were only collected twice daily at stations around the country; by the time these data were collected and maps were hand-drawn, the information was no longer representative of the actual weather conditions.

== Prelude ==
The Great Lakes Storm of 1913 was first noticed on Thursday, November 6 on the western side of Lake Superior, moving rapidly toward northern Lake Michigan. The weather forecast in The Detroit News predicted "moderate to brisk" winds at the Great Lakes with occasional rain on Thursday night or Friday for the upper lakes (except southern Lake Huron) and fair-to-unsettled conditions for the lower lakes. Around midnight on November 6–7, the steamer Cornell, which was 50 miles (80 km) west of Whitefish Point in Lake Superior, ran into a sudden northerly gale and was severely damaged. This gale lasted until late November 10 and almost forced Cornell ashore.

== Storm ==
By November 7, a string of low-pressure centers in Canada had consolidated into a low-pressure center southwest of Lake Superior which became "Storm #1". At the same time, warm air pushed into the central Great Lakes from the south. By November 8, this storm was moving east through northern Lake Huron while strong northerly winds developed behind it over Lake Superior. By November 9, "Storm #2" had formed over the Carolinas and Virginia. The northern portion of this storm began sweeping warm moist Atlantic air over colder air in the Ohio area producing heavy snows. The northwest portion of this extremely powerful storm began creating strong winds from the north along the long axis of Lake Huron, building large waves. By November 10, 24 hours of such building had created immense waves which ships were subjected to along with the high winds as the center of the storm crossed north/northwest over Lake Erie toward Toronto. Surface pressures went as low as 968.5 hectopascals (millibars), the lowest of the storm.

Winds exceeding hurricane-force occurred over four of the Great Lakes for extended periods. Wave heights observed during the storm were estimated by observation rather than measurement; observations of regular waves exceeding 35 ft (11 m) were corroborated by modern-day simulations which estimate these at 38 ft (12 m). Interaction between waves (such as those reflected from vertical shorelines) can nearly double wave heights; observations of such waves during the storm estimated some as high as 50 ft (15 m).

US weather maps showing the progression of the storm
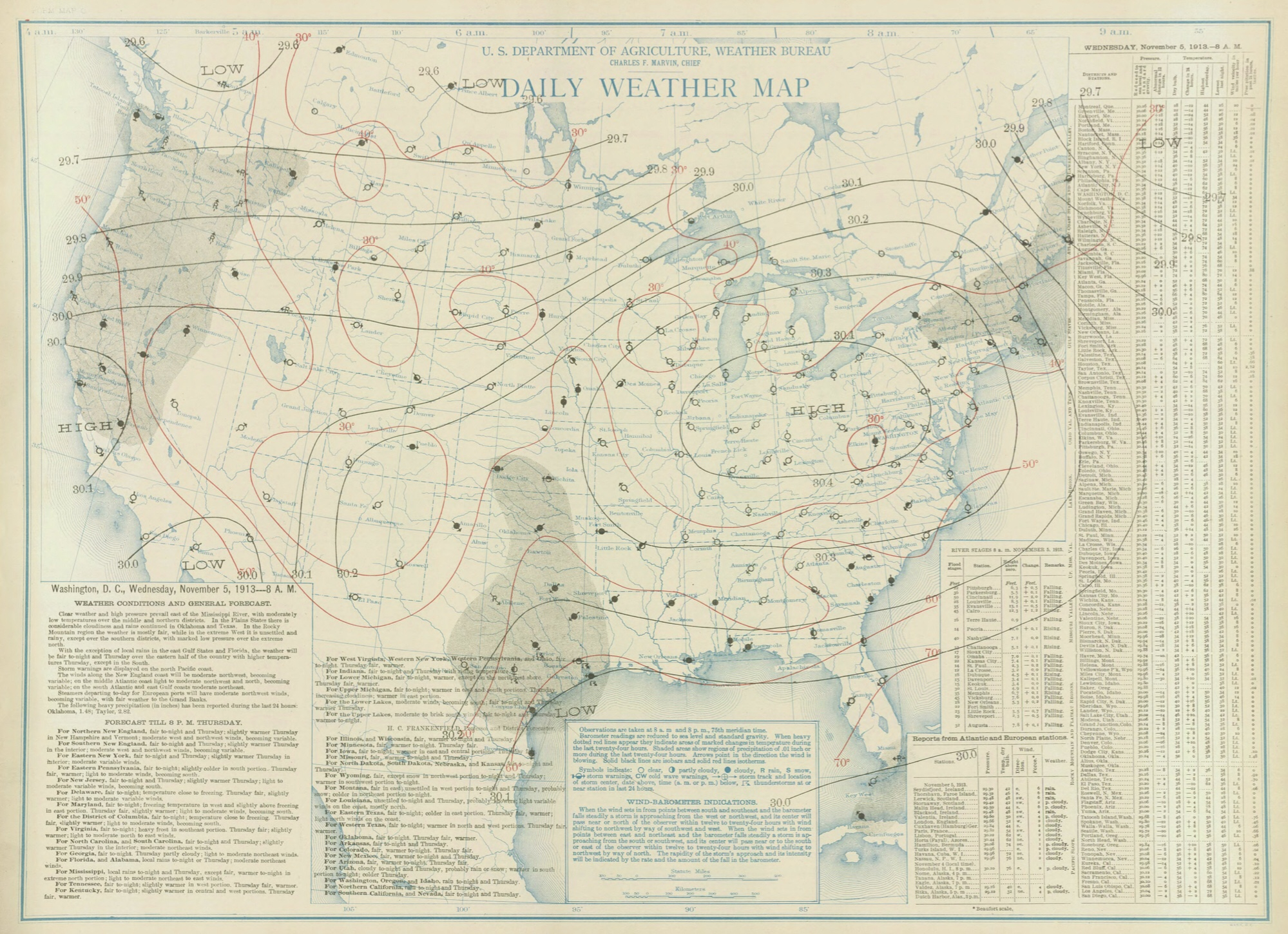
November 5

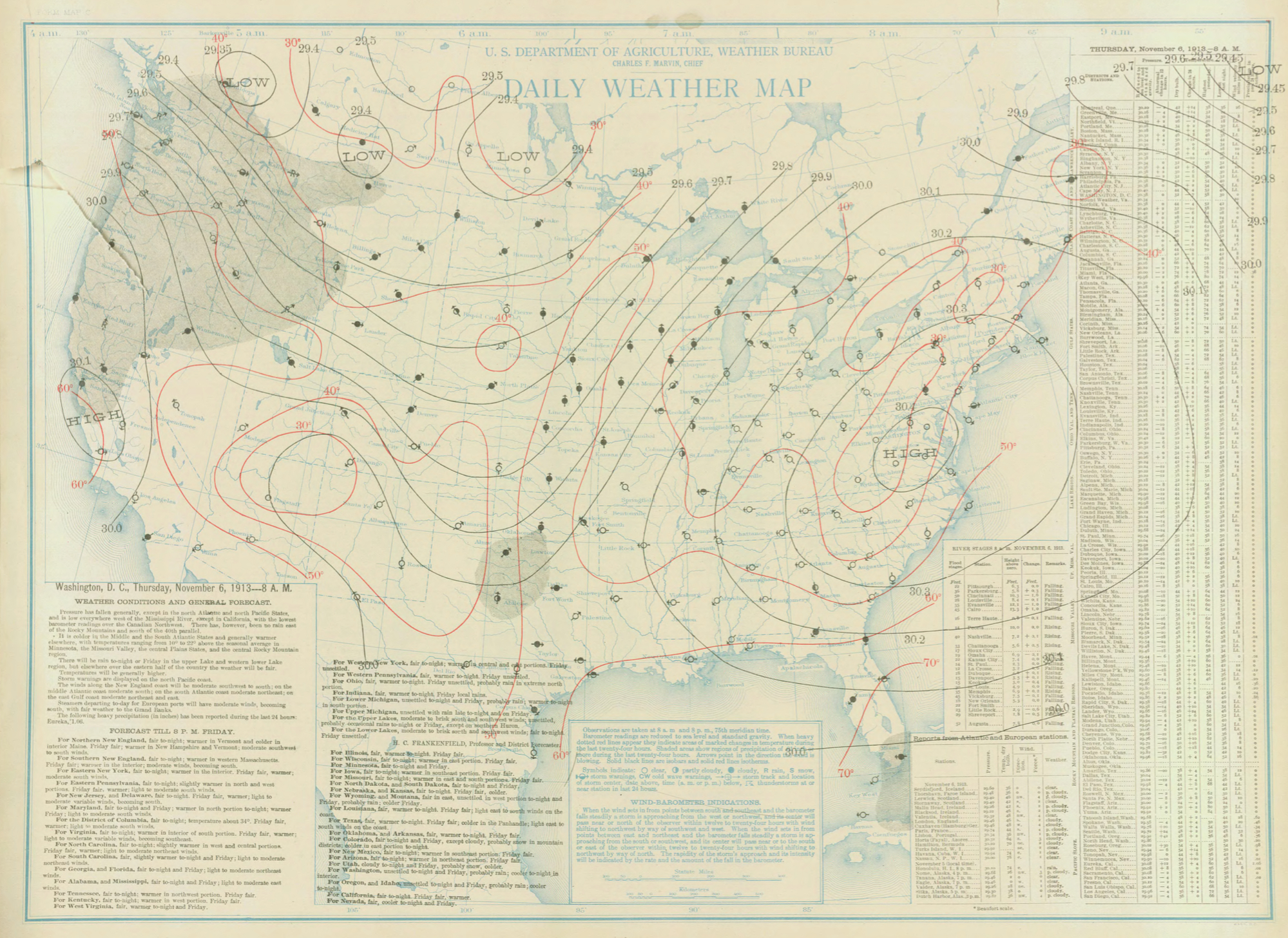
November 6

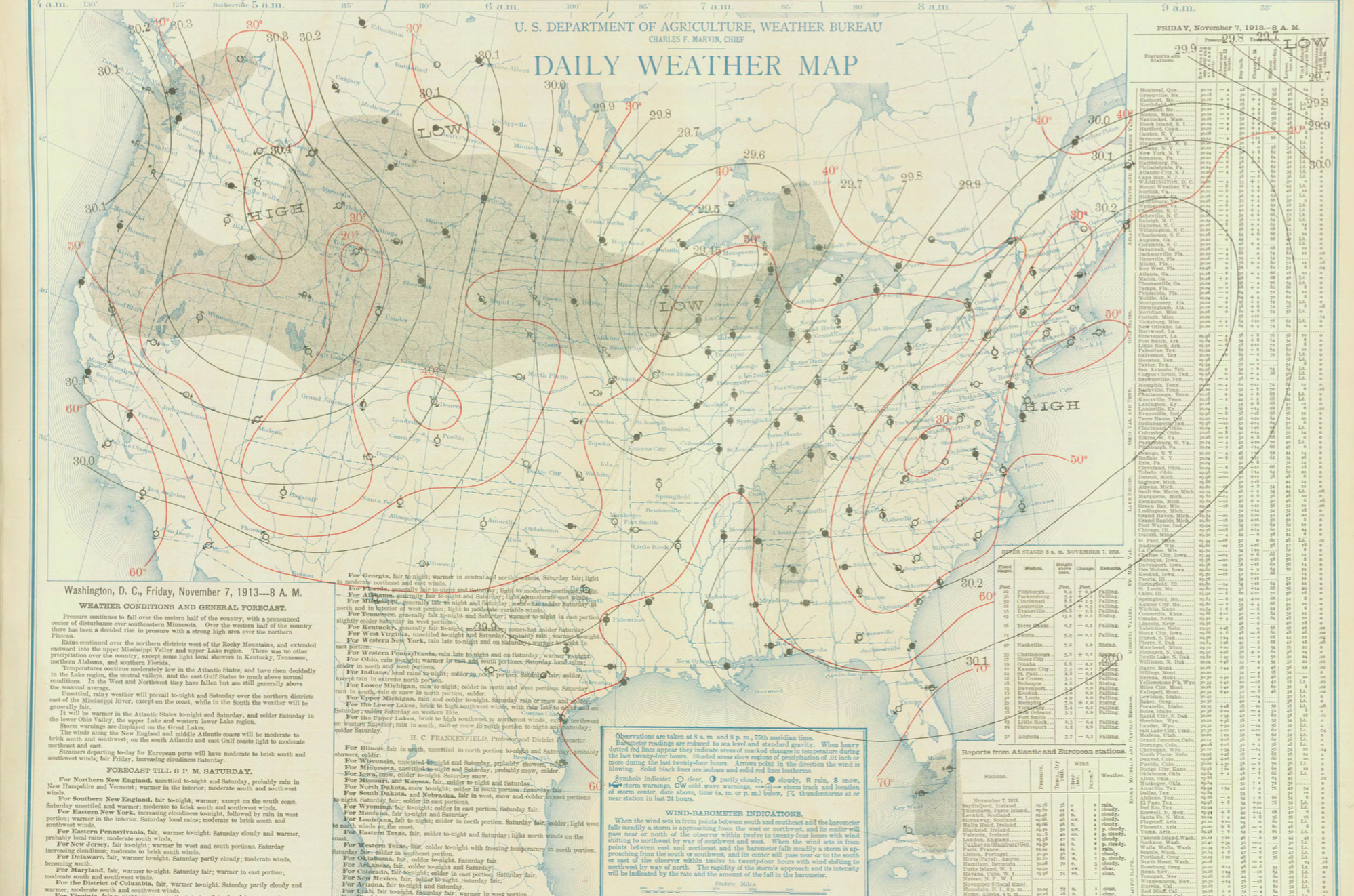
November 7

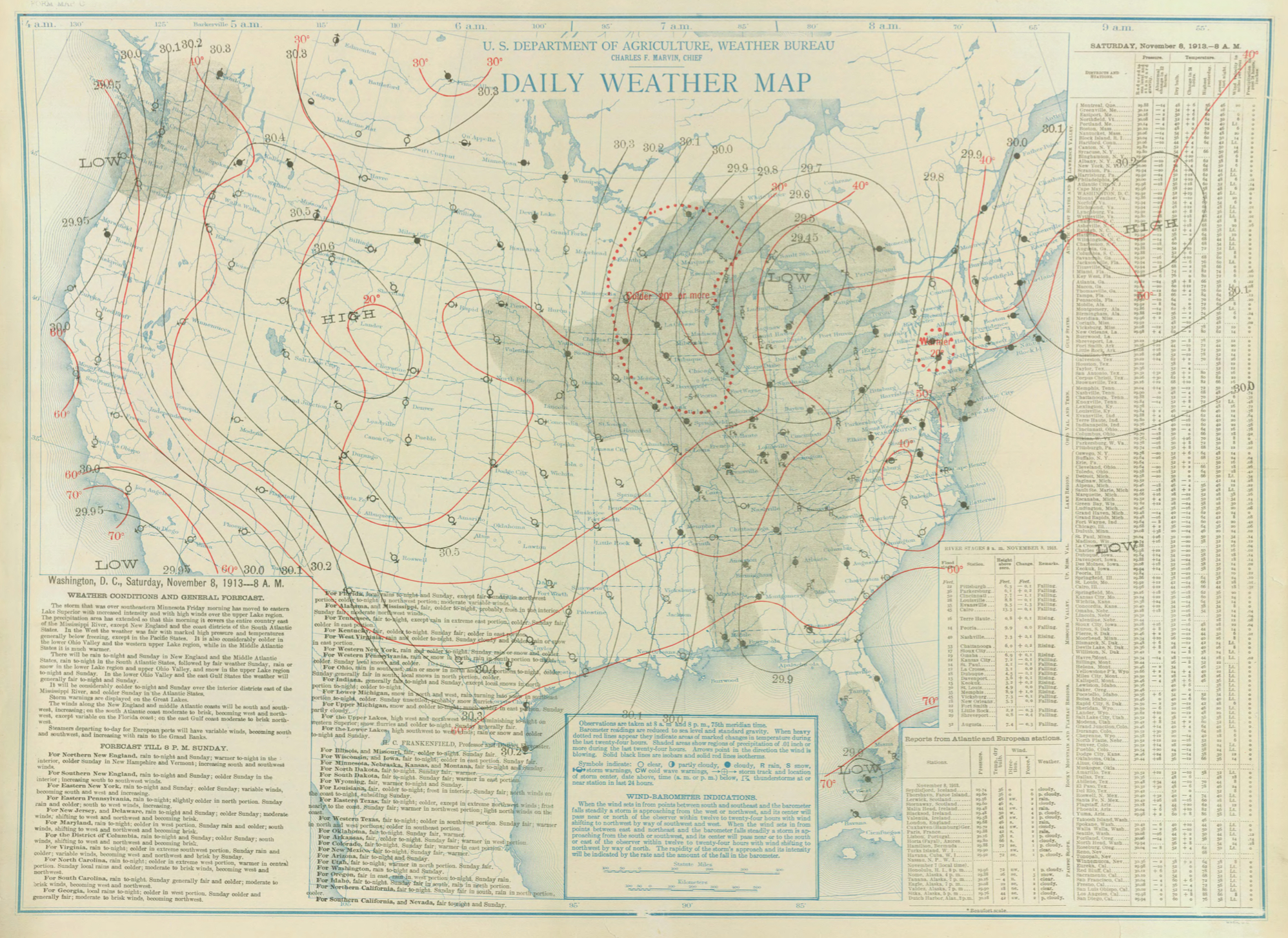
November 8

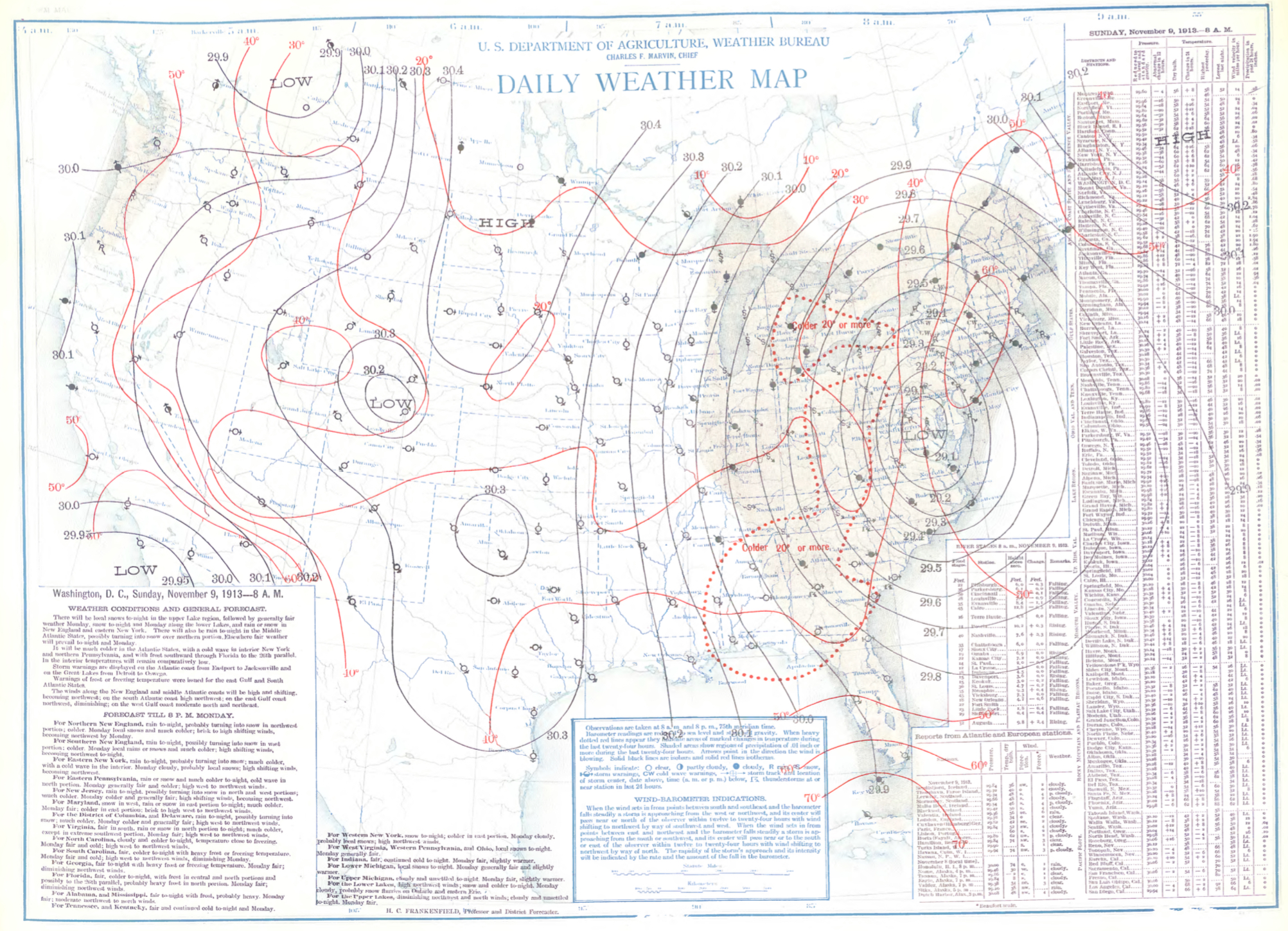
November 9

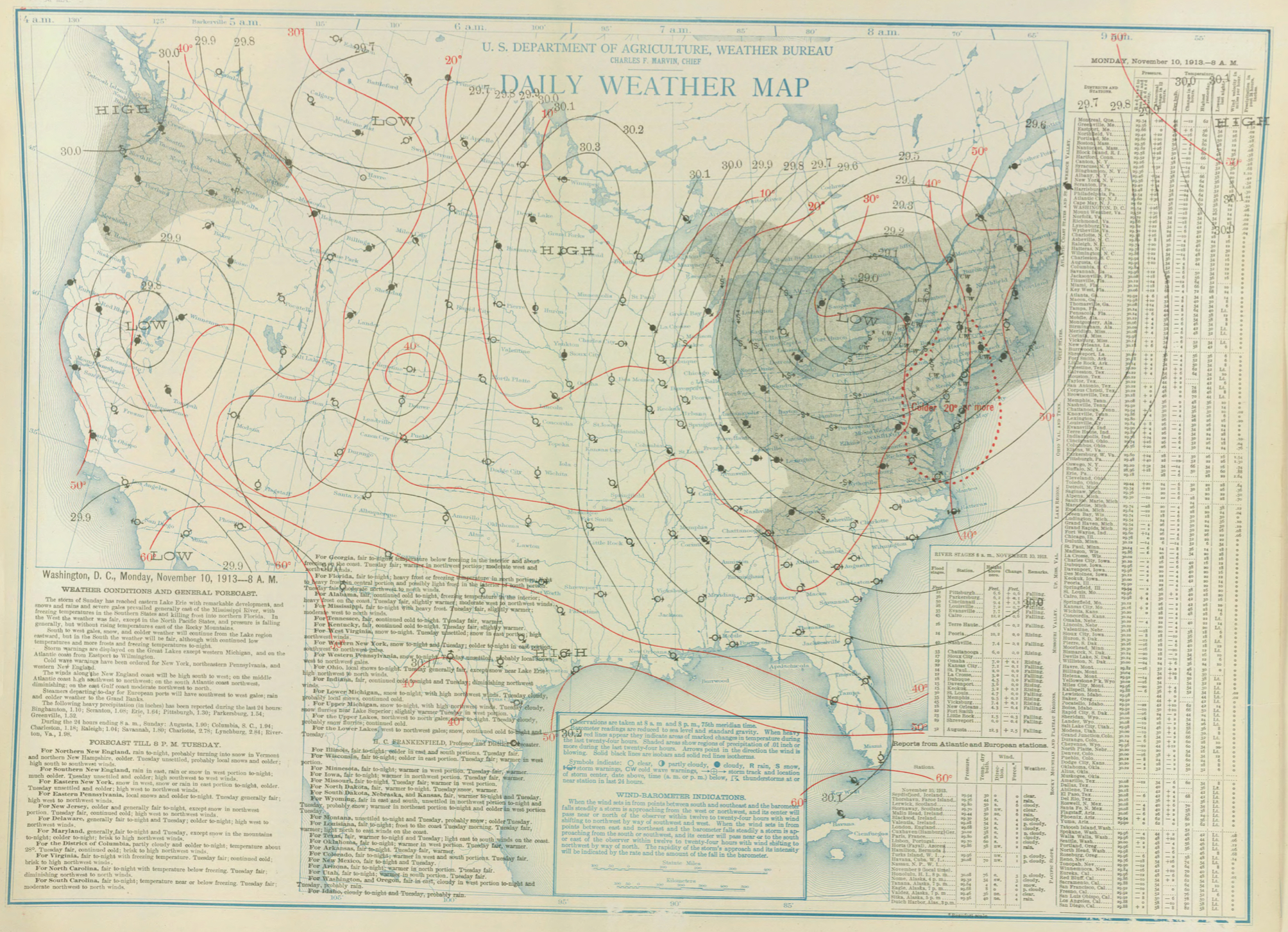
November 10

=== November 7 ===
On Friday, the weather forecast in the Port Huron, Michigan, Times-Herald described the storm as "moderately severe". The forecast predicted increased winds and falling temperatures over the next 24 hours. At 10:00 a.m., United States Coast Guard stations and all 112 Weather Bureau signal stations on the Great Lakes received a directive to hoist a square, red signal flag with a black center and a red, triangular maritime pennant below it, indicating a storm with winds of 55 mph (89 km/h) that would blow from the southwest. After dark, a red lantern over a white one was displayed to warn of storm winds from the west. The winds on Lake Superior had already reached 60 mph (97 km/h), with gusts to 80 mph (130 km/h), and an accompanying blizzard was moving toward Lake Huron. Sustained wind speeds reached 62 mph (100 km/h) and gusts to 68 mph (109 km/h) at Duluth.

=== November 8 ===
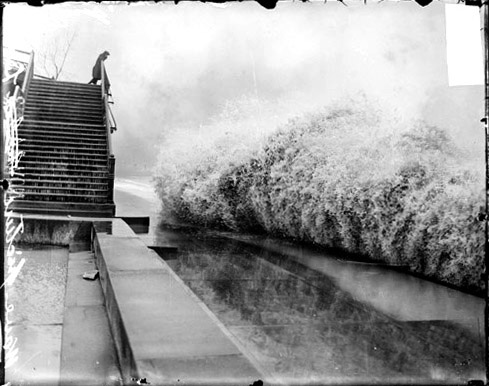
A wave breaking on the shore of Lake Michigan in Chicago while a man watches from a bridge

By Saturday, the storm's status had been upgraded to "severe". At 10:00 a.m., Coast Guard stations and Weather Bureau offices at Lake Superior ports raised white pennants above red and black storm warning flags, indicating a storm warning with northwesterly winds. The storm was centered over eastern Lake Superior, covering the entire lake basin. The weather forecast of the Times-Herald stated southerly winds had remained "moderate to brisk". Northwesterly winds had reached gale strength on northern Lake Michigan and western Lake Superior. Gale wind flags were raised at more than 100 ports, but many captains continued their journeys. Long ships traveled through the St. Marys River all that day, through the Straits of Mackinac all night, and up the Detroit and St. Clair rivers early the following morning.

The 472 feet (144 m) steel bulk freighter L. C. Waldo, 18 hours out of Two Harbors, Minnesota, was overrun by monster waves out of the northwest on Lake Superior. Approximately 45 miles northeast of Keweenaw Peninsula, an estimated 50 ft (15 m) rogue wave smashed the wheelhouse; bent the steel floor of the compass room; swept the wheelsman out of the wheelhouse; and tore three of the walls from the Texas (the level of the deck house below the wheelhouse). The captain ordered that the ship be turned around to try to reach shelter behind the Keweenaw Peninsula. As recounted by second mate Feeger: "The wind sent one gigantic wave after another over parts of the ship...The snow was so blinding that none of us could see 50 feet ahead". Waldo's rudder then failed; helpless without it, 70 mph (110 km/h) winds drove the ship aground on Gull Rock near Manitou Island. With the bow wedged in the rocks, the hull shredded, and a crack forming in the deck, the captain ordered everyone to the bow and to flooded ship to prevent her from being washed back into the depths of the lake. The steward's wife and her mother were reluctant to leave the stern, and the crew struggled to carry them over hundreds of feet of open deck in the storm, including traversing a widening crack. During the process the chief engineer and two stokers ran the ship at full power to try to wedge the bow further onto the shore. They then abandoned the stern and took shelter with the others in the unheated windlass room.

=== November 9 ===
By noon on Sunday, barometric pressures in some areas began to rise, bringing hopes of an end to the storm. The low pressure area that had moved across Lake Superior was moving northeast, away from the lakes. The Weather Bureau issued the first of its twice-daily reports at approximately 8:00 a.m.; it did not send another report to Washington, D.C., until 8:00 p.m. This proved to be a serious problem; the storm would have most of the day to build up hurricane-force winds before the Bureau headquarters in Washington would have detailed information.

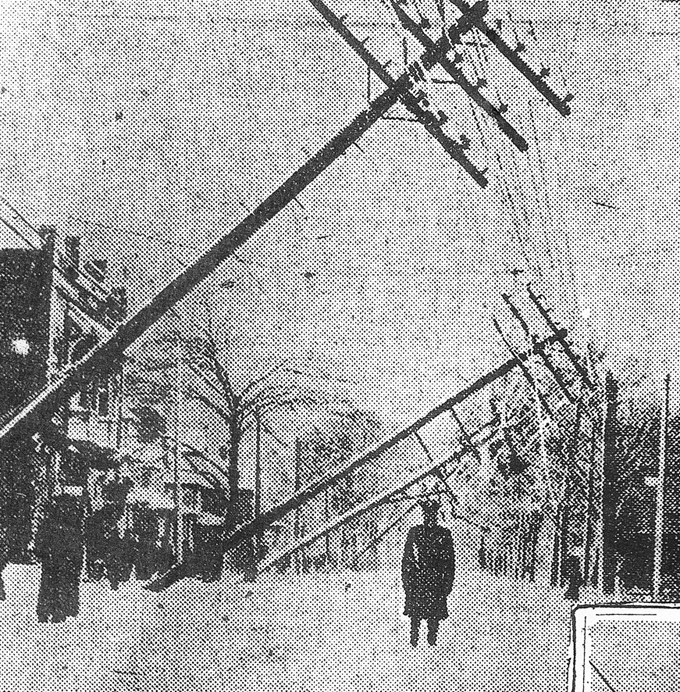
East 105th Street, Cleveland, downed power lines on November 11

Along southeastern Lake Erie near Erie, Pennsylvania, a southern low-pressure area was moving toward the lake. This low had formed overnight so was absent from Friday's weather map. It had been moving northward but turned northwestward after passing over Washington. The low's intense, counterclockwise rotation was made apparent by the changing wind directions around its center. In Buffalo, New York, morning northwest winds had shifted to the northeast by noon and to the southeast by 5:00 p.m., with gusts of up to 80 mph (130 km/h) occurring between 1:00 p.m. and 2:00 p.m. In Cleveland, Ohio, 180 miles (290 km) to the southwest, winds remained northwest during the day, shifting to the west by 5:00 p.m., and maintaining speeds of more than 50 mph (80 km/h). The fastest gust in Cleveland, 79 mph (127 km/h), occurred at 4:40 p.m. At Buffalo, barometric pressure dropped from 29.52 inHg (999.7 hPa) at 8:00 a.m. to 28.77 inHg (974.3 hPa) at 8:00 p.m.

The rotating low continued northward into the evening, bringing its counterclockwise winds in phase with the northwesterly winds already hitting Lakes Superior and Huron. This resulted in a dramatic increase in northerly wind speeds and swirling snow. Ships on Lake Huron that were south of Alpena, Michigan—especially around Harbor Beach and Port Huron—experienced massive waves moving southward toward St. Clair River. Some ships sought shelter along the Michigan shore or between Goderich and Point Edward, Ontario. Three of the larger ships were found capsized, indicating extremely high winds and tall waves. From 8:00 p.m. to midnight, the storm became a "weather bomb" with sustained hurricane-force winds of more than 70 mph (110 km/h) on the four western lakes. The worst damage was done on Lake Huron as ships sought shelter along its southern end. Gusts of 90 mph (140 km/h) were reported off Harbor Beach. The lake's shape allowed northerly winds to increase unimpeded.

=== November 10 and 11 ===
The storm had moved northeast of London, Ontario, by Monday morning, with lake effect blizzards behind it. An additional 17 inches (43 cm) of snow fell on Cleveland that day, filling the streets with snowdrifts 6 feet (180 cm) high. Streetcar operators stayed with their stranded, powerless vehicles for two nights, eating food provided by local residents. Travelers were forced to take shelter and wait for the storm to pass.

By Tuesday, the storm was rapidly moving across eastern Canada. Without the warm lake waters, it quickly lost strength. The system carried less snowfall because of its speed and the lack of lake effect snow. All shipping along the St. Lawrence River around Montreal was halted on Monday and part of Tuesday.

== Aftermath ==
The storm was the deadliest, most destructive natural disaster in recorded history to hit the Great Lakes, killing more than 250 people, destroying 19 ships and stranding 19 others. About 68,300 tons of cargo—including coal, iron ore, and grain—were lost. The Lake Carriers Association 1913 report estimates damages at nearly $4.8 million ($162 million in 2026).

=== Surrounding shoreline ===
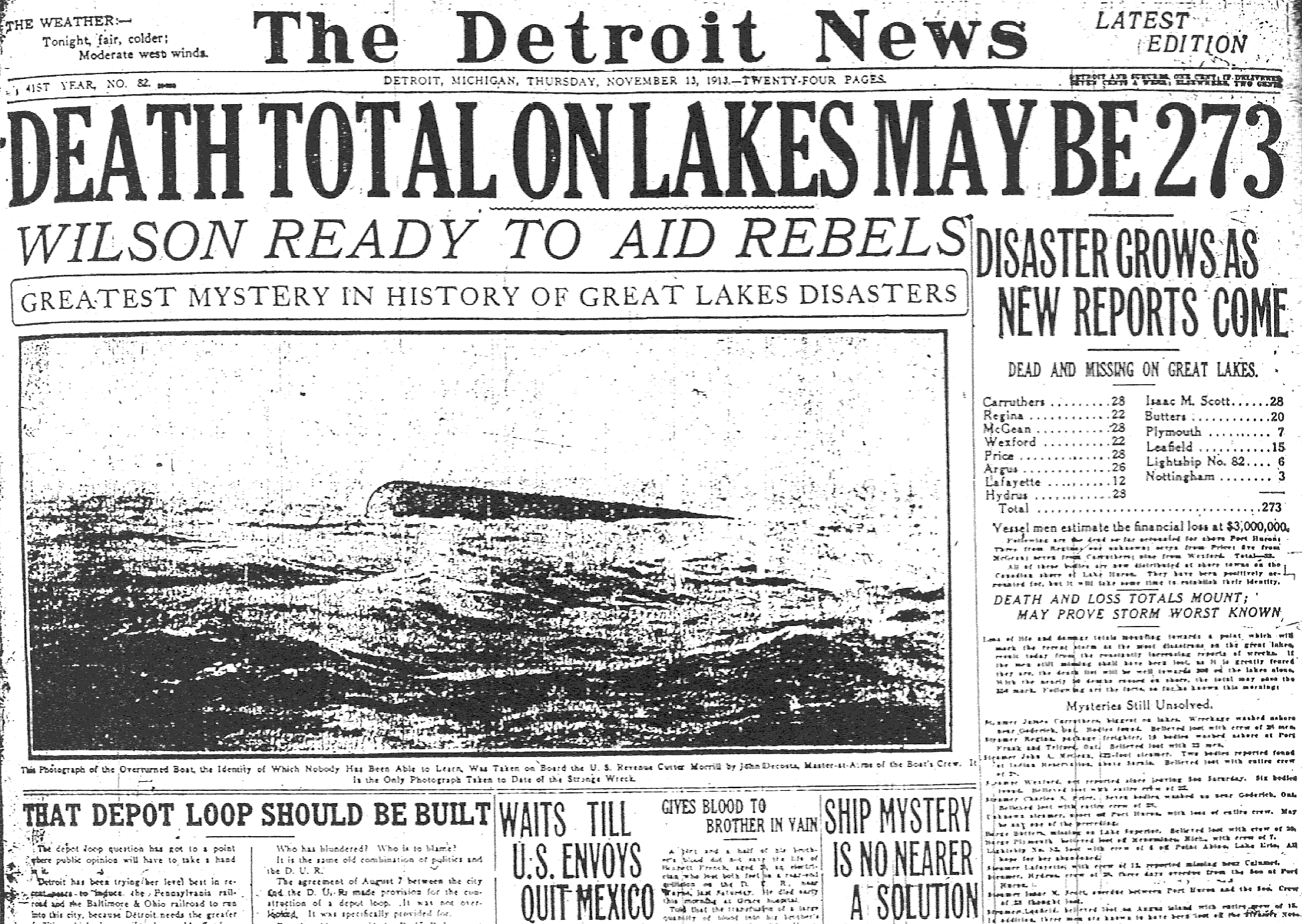
The Detroit News storm headlines, November 13, 1913

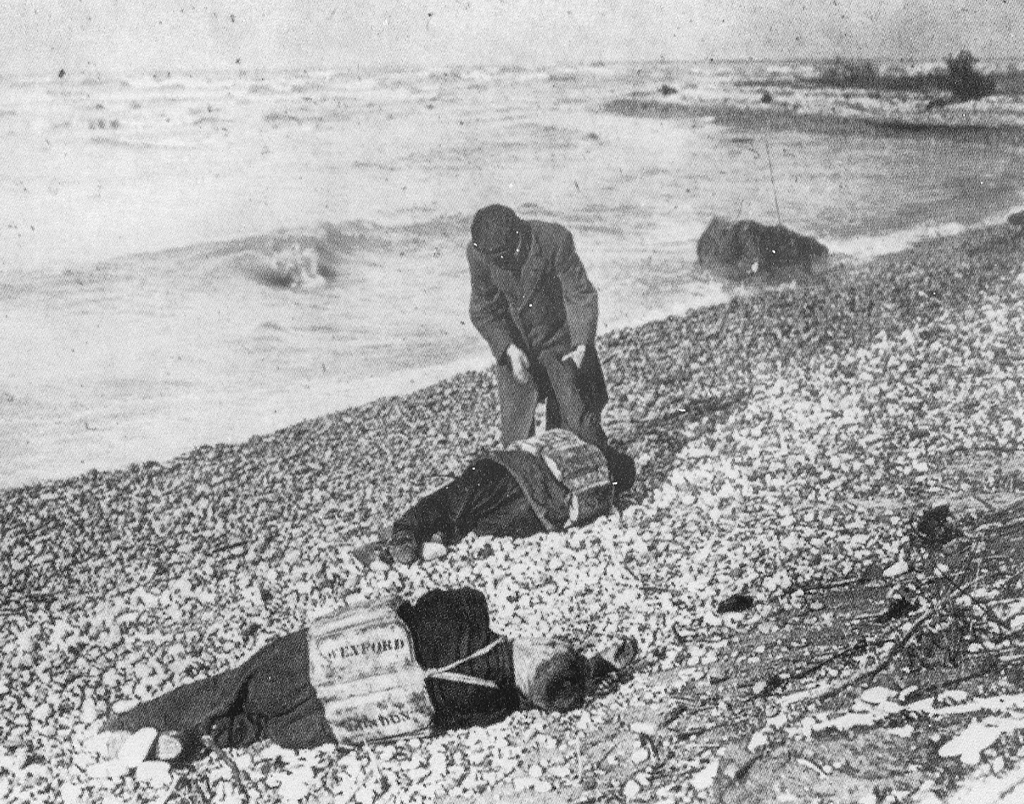
Bodies from Wexford washed ashore near Goderich, Ontario

Along the shoreline, blizzards stopped traffic and communication, causing hundreds of thousands of dollars in damages. Cleveland received 22 inches (56 cm) of heavy snow combined with sustained winds of 62 mph (100 km/h) with gusts to 79 mph (127 km/h) and ice formation. There were four-foot (120 cm) snowdrifts around Lake Huron. Electricity supply was disrupted for several days across Michigan and Ontario, cutting off telephone and telegraph communications. A recently completed US$100,000 breakwater at Chicago, which was intended to protect Lincoln Park from storms, was swept away in a few hours. The Milwaukee harbor lost its south breakwater and much of the surrounding South Park area that had been recently renovated.

Cleveland was paralyzed under feet of ice and snow and was without power for days. Telephone poles were broken, and power cables lay in tangled masses. Nearly all rail traffic was halted. The November 11 Plain Dealer describes the aftermath: "Cleveland lay in white and mighty solitude, mute and deaf to the outside world, a city of lonesome snowiness, storm-swept from end to end, when the violence of the two-day blizzard lessened late yesterday afternoon." (Note: Reprinted in Brown (2002).) William H. Alexander, Cleveland's chief weather forecaster, commented:

Take it all in all—the depth of the snowfall, the tremendous wind, the amount of damage done and the total unpreparedness of the people—I think it is safe to say that the present storm is the worst experienced in Cleveland during the whole forty-three years the U.S. Weather Bureau has been established in the city. (Note: Reprinted in Brown (2002).)

There was a small death toll in Cleveland considering the severity of the storm. Sources describe one freezing death, plus some deaths from accidents. One death and one near-death were from downed power lines. Immediately following the blizzard, the city began a campaign to move all utility cables underground. The project took five years.

=== On the lakes ===
The greatest damage was done on the Great Lakes. Major shipwrecks occurred on all but Lake Ontario, with most happening on southern and southwestern Lake Huron. Captains reported waves reaching at least 35 ft (11 m) in height. Among the debris cast up by the storm was the wreckage of the tugboat Searchlight, which was lost in April 1907.

In the late afternoon of November 10, an unknown vessel was spotted floating upside-down in about 60 feet (18 m) of water on the eastern coast of Michigan, within sight of Huronia Beach and the mouth of the St. Clair River. Determining the identity of this "mystery ship" became a national interest, resulting in daily front-page newspaper coverage. The ship eventually sank and was identified on November 15 as Charles S. Price. The front page of that day's Times-Herald extra edition reads: "BOAT IS PRICE—DIVER IS BAKER—SECRET KNOWN." Milton Smith, an assistant engineer who decided at the last moment not to join his crew on premonition of disaster, helped identify bodies from the wreck.

While the storm was the main cause of damage on the lakes, human factors—including measures that could have reduced the storm's effects but were not taken—also contributed. Post-storm conversations mostly focused on placing blame but served to highlight weaknesses. The Weather Bureau did not have the ability to predict the storm but hesitated to admit its limitations because it wanted to secure higher budgets. Instead, it focused on the terminology and nature of warnings. Another factor was the underpowering of large ships that affected their ability to travel, maneuver, and hold steady in severe storms. Even with both anchors dropped and steaming full power into the wind, several were unable to avoid being carried backward. For example, the 504 ft-long (154 m) Charles S. Price had a single 1,760 horsepower engine. Three years after the storm, the same shipyard built a 587-foot-long (179 m) freighter with only 1,800 hp (1,300 kW).

The geometry of the lakes and locks, combined with operational economics, dictated the use of slimmer, shallower ships than comparable ocean-going vessels, reducing stability and structural strength. The "straight deck" ship design was becoming prevalent, requiring more and larger hatch covers, which increased vulnerability to storms. Insufficient strength of the hatches and their fastenings was also noted, as well as the shortness of the 12 in (30 cm) hatch coamings. The limited compartmentalization of cargo holds meant the flooding of one compartment was sufficient to sink the ship. The practice of not "trimming" or leveling the pyramid-shape piles of bulk cargo made them more prone to shifting and causing a capsize. Many raised concerns about the practice of shipping companies incentivizing or pressuring captains to sail during the dangerous November season and during dangerous weather. These concerns continued and were echoed 62 years later after the sinking of Edmund Fitzgerald. Few of these factors were acted upon. One change was that the Weather Bureau clarified their previous ambiguity and said that they would post a higher-than-gale level warning for the most severe predicted storms.

== Ships foundered ==
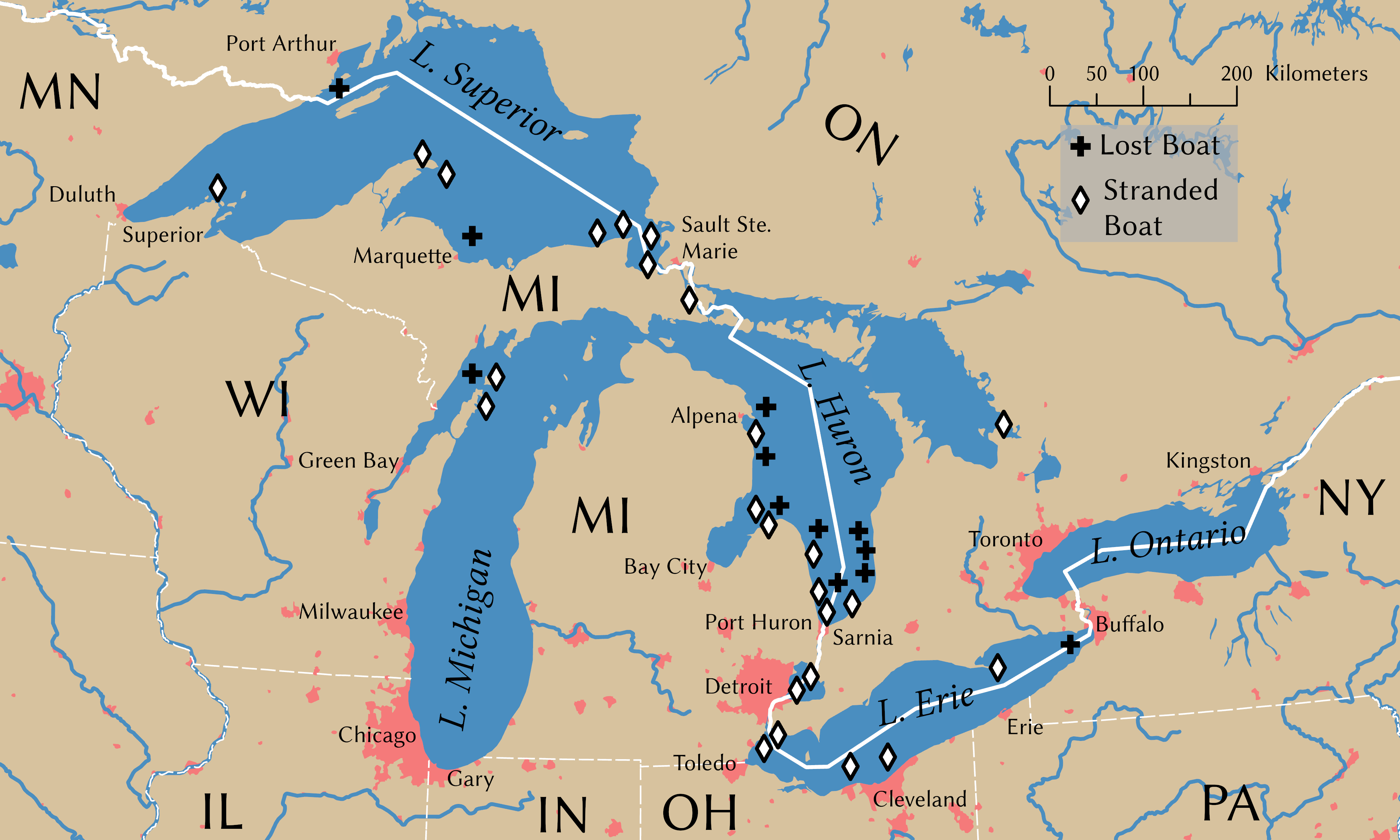
Geographical diagram of ships wrecked during the storm

The ships that sank during the storm with all hands are ordered in the table below by the number of victims. The table does not include the three victims from the freighter William Nottingham, who had volunteered to leave the ship on a lifeboat in search of assistance. (Note: While the boat was being lowered into the water, a breaking wave smashed it into the side of the ship. The men disappeared into the near-freezing waters below.) Most of the bodies were recovered on the Canadian shores of southern Lake Huron. The lost ships included some of the newest and largest ships on the Great Lakes.

Name	Flag	Cargo	Body of water	Number of victims	Year located	Approximate coordinates	Length	Beam	Image	Sources
Argus	United States	Coal	Lake Huron	28	1972	44.303039°N 82.825208°W	436 ft (133 m)	50 ft (15 m)		
Charles S. Price	United States	Coal	Lake Huron	28	1913	43.1529°N 82.3529°W	524 ft (160 m)	54 ft (16 m)		
Hydrus	United States	Iron ore	Lake Huron	25	2015	44.561667°N 82.61375°W	436 ft (133 m)	50 ft (15 m)		
Isaac M. Scott	United States	Coal	Lake Huron	28	1976	45.065333°N 83.039217°W	524 ft (160 m)	54 ft (16 m)		
James Carruthers	Canada	Wheat	Lake Huron	22	2025	43.535278°N 82.344194°W	550 ft (170 m)	58 ft (18 m)		
John A. McGean	United States	Coal	Lake Huron	28	1985	43.953267°N 82.528617°W	452 ft (138 m)	52 ft (16 m)		
Regina	Canada	Steel pipes, package freight	Lake Huron	20	1986	43.337°N 82.446°W	249.25 ft (75.97 m)	42.5 ft (13.0 m)		
Wexford	United Kingdom	Steel rails	Lake Huron	20	2000	43.416667°N 81.916667°W	250 ft (76 m)	40 ft (12 m)		
Henry B. Smith	United States	Iron ore	Lake Superior	23	2013	46.914°N 87.333°W	545 ft (166 m)	55 ft (17 m)		
Leafield	Canada	Steel rails	Lake Superior	18	Not located	Unknown	249 ft (76 m)	35.5 ft (10.8 m)		
Plymouth	United States	Lumber	Lake Michigan	7	Possibly 1984, unconfirmed	Unknown	213 ft (65 m)	32 ft (9.8 m)		
LV-82 Buffalo	United States	None	Lake Erie	6	1914	Raised and later scrapped	95.2 ft (29.0 m)	21 ft (6.4 m)		

== See also ==
- October 2010 North American storm complex
- List of storms on the Great Lakes
