= Pneumonic =

Pneumonic (not to be confused with mnemonic) may refer to:

- Lung
- Pneumonic plague, a lung infection with Yersinia pestis
- Someone with Pneumonia
