= Pneumonia front =

Meteorological phenomenon near Lake Michigan, US

Modeled pneumonia front over southeastern Wisconsin, May 16, 2023; see full-size version

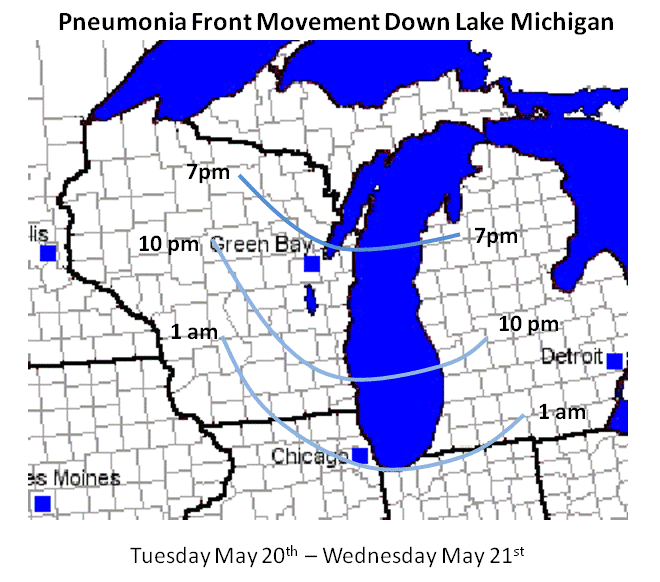
Map showing motion of the pneumonia front of May 20–21, 2008.

A pneumonia front, also known as a lake-modified synoptic scale cold front, is a rare meteorological phenomenon observed in coastal areas of Lake Michigan, in the United States, most commonly between the months of April to July. The phenomenon, according to the National Weather Service, consists of a cold front that accelerates southerly down Lake Michigan, rapidly dropping temperatures in coastal areas of the lake by 16 °F (8.9 °C) or greater. These fronts are often followed by fog clouds, and, less commonly, rain.

Pneumonia fronts are most often observed when there is a large temperature difference between the cold lake waters and the warmer air over land, sometimes as much as 35–40 °F (19–22 °C). These conditions are present in spring and early summer. Under weak prevailing winds, a density current can often develop in the form of a lake breeze that moves from that water to the adjacent shoreline and several miles inland.

Pneumonia fronts occur most frequently on Lake Michigan's southwestern shore, in cities such as Chicago, Milwaukee, and Kenosha. However, they are also commonly observed elsewhere on the lakeshore, including cities such as Michigan City, Benton Harbor, Green Bay, and Traverse City.

== History ==
The first documented pneumonia front was on June 13, 1909, in Michigan City, Indiana. The term 'pneumonia front' was coined by the National Weather Service in Milwaukee in the 1960s.

== Causes ==
Pneumonia fronts occur when a cold front (generally of synoptic scale), typically approaching from the north or northeast, encounters a mass of cold, dense air that has persisted over Lake Michigan, typically a remnant of winter conditions. The air mass fuels the cold front, allowing it to grow in density and momentum as it travels south along the lake. This movement displaces the warmer, less dense air over land, leading to an abrupt and significant temperature drop. Lake Michigan's elongated north-south shape and two long north-south bays (Green Bay and Grand Traverse Bay) allow for pneumonia fronts to pick up great speed and change air temperatures relatively far inland.

== Documented occurrences ==
The following are documented occurrences of a lake-modified synoptic scale cold front or a "pneumonia front":

Date	Location
June 13, 1909	Michigan City, Indiana
May 21, 1938	Will County, Illinois
June 6, 1967	Cook County, Illinois
June 30, 1975	Lake County, Indiana
July 1, 1983	Kenosha County, Wisconsin
July 17, 2003	Lake Michigan
May 20, 2008	Eastern Wisconsin (Lake Michigan)
May 21, 2008	Eastern Wisconsin (Lake Michigan)
May 26, 2008	Cook and Lake Counties, Illinois; Lake and Porter counties, Indiana
April 25, 2009	Cook and Lake Counties, Illinois
June 1, 2009	Cook and Lake Counties, Illinois
April 21, 2010	Cook, Lake and Will Counties, Illinois; Lake and Porter Counties, Indiana
May 13, 2011	Cook, Lake and Will Counties, Illinois; Lake and Porter Counties, Indiana
March 15, 2012	Cook and Lake Counties, Illinois; Lake County, Indiana; Milwaukee, Racine and Kenosha Counties, Wisconsin
April 13, 2014	Cook, Lake and Will Counties, Illinois; Lake and Porter Counties, Indiana
May 27, 2014	Cook, Lake and Dupage Counties, Illinois; Milwaukee, Racine and Kenosha Counties, Wisconsin
September 29, 2014	Cook, Lake, Dupage and Will Counties, Illinois; Milwaukee, Racine and Kenosha Counties, Wisconsin
March 24, 2017	Cook, Lake, Dupage and Will Counties, Illinois; Milwaukee, Racine and Kenosha Counties, Wisconsin
April 10, 2017	Waukesha, Milwaukee, Racine and Kenosha Counties, Wisconsin
June 1, 2018	Cook County, Illinois; Porter County, Indiana
May 3, 2020	Northeast Illinois; Milwaukee, Racine, and Kenosha Counties, Wisconsin
April 27, 2021	Cook County, Illinois; Lake, Porter, and LaPorte Counties, Indiana
May 10, 2022	Emmet, Charlevoix, Grand Traverse, and Leelanau Counties, Michigan
June 17, 2022	Milwaukee County, Wisconsin
April 14, 2023	Grand Traverse County, Michigan
May 16, 2023	Southeastern Wisconsin, Northeastern Illinois
March 26, 2026	Cook County, Illinois

== See also ==
- Bomb cyclone
- Cold front
- Hurricane Huron
- Lake-effect snow
- November gale
- Pneumonia
