= United States lightship Buffalo (LV-82) =

1911 ship

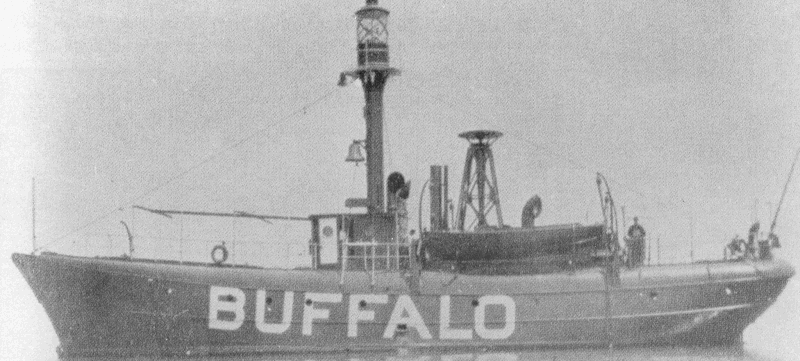
- United States lightship Buffalo (LV-82)

History

United States
- Name: Buffalo LV-82
- Owner: United States Lighthouse Service
- Builder: Racine-Truscott-Shell Lake Boat Company (Muskegon, Michigan)
- Cost: $42,910
- Launched: 1911
- Commissioned: 1912
- Out of service: 1936
- Renamed: Relief LV-82 (1916-1925) Eleven Foot LV-82 (1926-1936)
- Fate: Burned by vandals and then scrapped in the 1940s

General characteristics
- Tonnage: 187
- Length: 95.2 ft (29.0 m)
- Beam: 21 ft (6.4 m)
- Height: 10 ft (3.0 m)
- Draft: 7.2 ft (2.2 m)
- Installed power: 14 ft (4.3 m) diameter 120 psi boiler 90 HP steam engine
- Propulsion: 5 ft (1.5 m) Cast iron propeller with a 7.2 ft (2.2 m) pitch
- Complement: Six

United States lightship Buffalo (LV-82) was a lightship built in 1911 for the United States Lighthouse Service and stationed off Point Abino, Ontario, Canada to help guide vessels heading for the harbor at Buffalo, New York. During the Great Lakes Storm of 1913, LV-82 stayed at its assigned station and was sunk with the loss of all six crew members.

On May 13, 1914, the wreckage of LV-82 was located two miles from its assigned location in 63 feet of water. Following two failed salvage attempts, LV-82 was raised from the bottom using pontoons and sent to be refurbished. She served as a relief ship from 1916 to 1925, and was stationed as the Eleven Foot Shoals Lightship from 1925 up to her decommissioning.

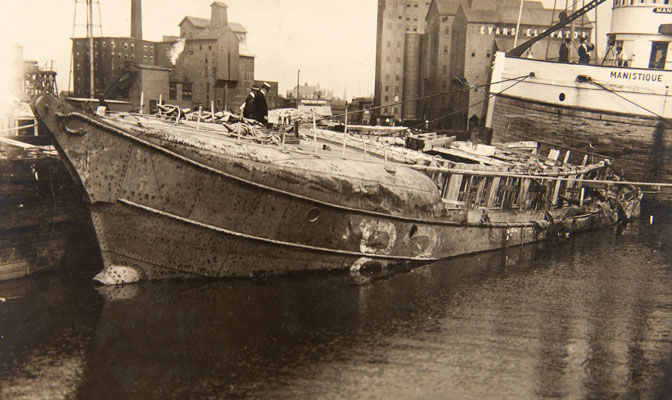
Lightship Buffalo (LV-82) after it was raised in 1915

The Buffalo was in service until 1936 when she was decommissioned. After decommissioning, papers were signed by President Franklin D. Roosevelt to have her moved to a VFW post in Massachusetts. However, this never happened as she was burnt at the dock by random vandals, and was considered a total loss, so she was scrapped.
