= List of shipwrecks in the Great Lakes =

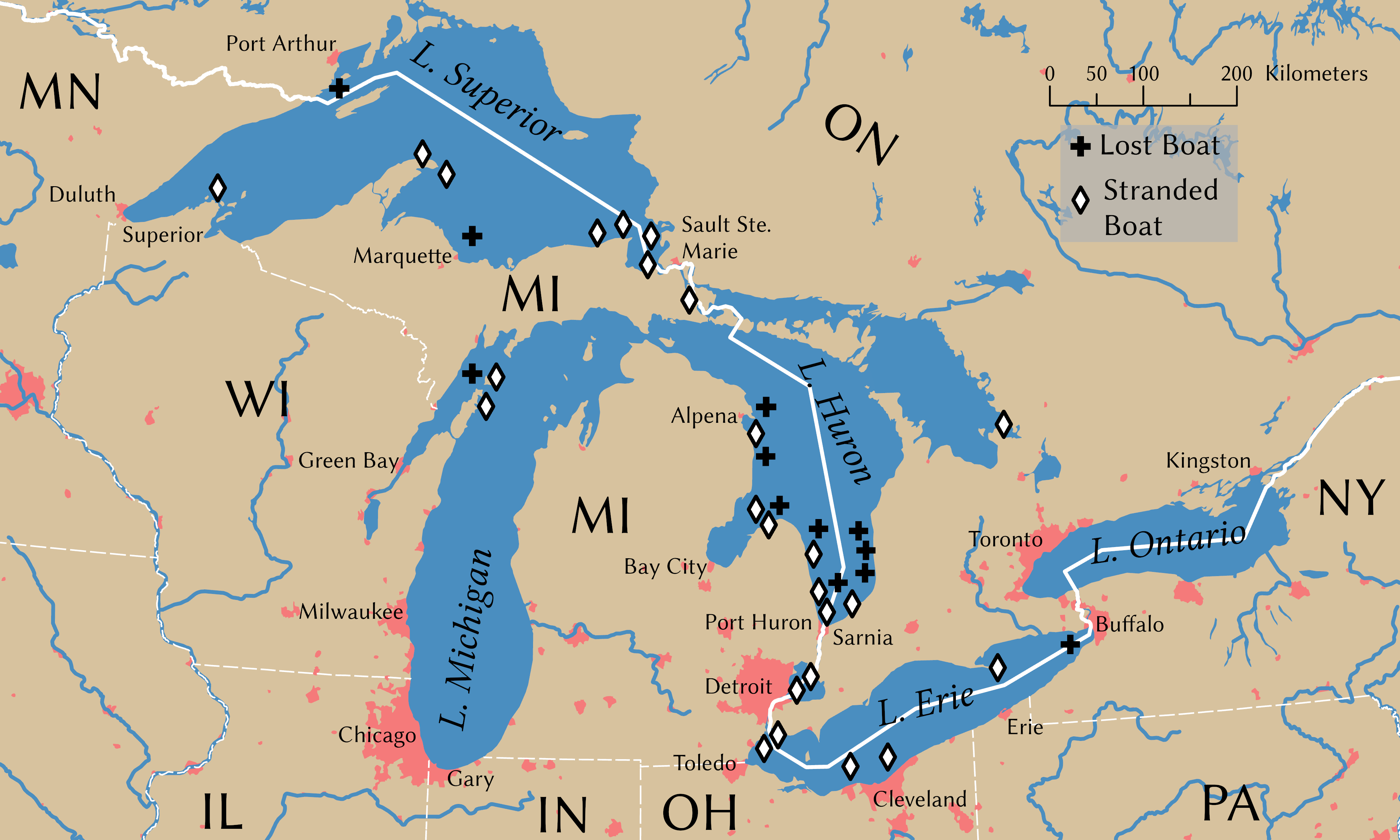
Map of the shipwrecks in the Great Storm of 1913

The Great Lakes, a collection of five freshwater lakes located in North America, have been sailed upon since at least the 17th century, and thousands of ships have been sunk while traversing them. Many of these ships were never found, so the exact number of shipwrecks in the Lakes is unknown; the Great Lakes Shipwreck Museum estimates 6,000 ships and 30,000 lives lost, while historian and mariner Mark Thompson has estimated that the total number of wrecks is likely more than 25,000. In the period between 1816, when the Invincible was lost, to the sinking of the Edmund Fitzgerald in 1975, the Whitefish Point area alone has claimed at least 240 ships.

== Lake Huron ==
Ship	Flag	Sunk date	Notes	Coordinates	Image
Africa		October 1895	Sank while carrying coal on the way from Ashtabula, Ohio to Owen Sound. Wreck discovered in June 2023.		
Arabia		October 1884	Barque that foundered off Echo Island near Tobermory, Ontario in 120 feet (37 m) of water.		
Argus	United States	9 November 1913	Wreckage found near Bayfield Ontario Canada		
Asia	Canada	14 September 1882			
Athens	United States	7 October 1917	The schooner barge foundered after her towline broke in a blizzard.		
CC Martin		1911	Tug lost with barge Albatross during storm off French River, ten lives lost.	45.51555°N 81.070277°W	
Cedarville	United States	7 May 1965	A bulk carrier that collided with Topdalsfjord in the Straits of Mackinac.	45°47.235′N 85°40.248′W	
Charles S. Price	United States	15 November 1913	Capsized in the Great Lakes Storm of 1913. Sighted floating upside-down on 10 November 1913 and identified as Charles S. Price before it sank on 15 November 1913. Wreck was not found until the 1960s.	43°11.89980′N 82°23.89980′W	
Choctaw	United States	12 February 1915	Sank in a collision with Wahcondah.	45.53427°N 83.50927°W	
City of Grand Rapids		29 October 1907	City of Grand Rapids was a double-decker passenger steamer that caught fire while docked in Little Tub Harbour. For the security of the harbour, the City of Grand Rapids was towed out into Georgian Bay and released to burn. From there she drifted to the head of Big Tub Harbour where she burnt to the waterline and sank.		
Clifton	United States	21-22 September 1924	The whaleback foundered in a storm near Thunder Bay Island.		
Cornelia B. Windiate		27 November 1875	Iced up and slowly sank in a storm after passing through the Straits of Mackinac.	45.325867°N 83.32665°W	
Daniel J. Morrell	United States	29 November 1966	Broke in two in a storm on Lake Huron, with the aft section coming to rest five miles from the bow.	43.850°N 82.590°W	
Dorcas Pendell		6 July 1914	Shallow-water shipwreck located in the harbor of Harbor Beach, Michigan. Dorcas Pendell was a schooner built in 1884 and burned in place on 6 July 1914 after running aground.		
D.R. Hanna	United States	16 May 1919	A 552-foot-long (168 m) steel freighter that sank in a collision with Quincy A. Shaw.	45.084167°N 83.08655°W	
Emma L. Nielson		26 June 1911	Collision in fog off Pointe Aux Barques.		
Equinox		10 September 1875	A steamship that sank near Au Sable during a storm in which 22 of 23 aboard were lost.		
Erie Belle	Canada	21 November 1883	A steamship that exploded and sank while attempting to rescue the stranded schooner J. N. Carter.	44.156741°N 81.658997°W	
Forest City		5 June 1904	The vessel ran aground and sank in foggy weather near south east end of Bear's Rump Island in Georgian Bay near Tobermory. The ship's smashed stem is in 60 feet (18 m) and stern is at 150 feet (46 m) depth.	45°19.0′N 81°33.0′W	
Hunter Savidge		20 August 1899	Capsized and sank off Pointe Aux Barques.		
Hydrus	United States	11 November 1913	Lost on Lake Huron during the Great Lakes Storm of 1913. Its wreck was discovered in July 2015.		
Ironton		26 September 1894	A schooner that sank in a collision with the wooden freighter Ohio.		
Isaac M. Scott	United States	9 November 1913	A lake freighter that sank in the Great Lakes Storm of 1913.	45°03′N 83°02′W	
James C. King		November 1901	While under tow by W. L. Wetmore, which was wrecked by a storm, James C. King was wrecked too at the northwest end of Bonnet Island near Tobermory, Ontario in about 90 feet (27 m) of water.		
James Carruthers	Canada	9 November 1913	Lost on Lake Huron during the Great Lakes Storm of 1913.	44.801°N 82.397°W	
James Davidson		4 October 1883	Wooden bulk freighter wrecked in shallow water off the coast of Thunder Bay Island while towing a consort-barge to Duluth. While still stranded, its engine and boiler were salvaged, and the rest of it has since broken up and separated about 35 feet (11 m) underwater.	45°01′56.64″N 83°11′33.78″W	
John A. McGean	United States	1913	Lost in storm off Harbor Beach in Lake Huron in the Great Storm of 1913. Wreck discovered in 1985.	43.953267°N 82.528617°W	
Kaliyuga	United States	October 1905	A wooden steamship lost in a storm. In October 1905 crew of 16 were lost		
Lottie Wolf		16 October 1891	The schooner broke up in gale force seas in shallow water about 200 feet (61 m) off the Hope Island Lighthouse in about 30 feet (9.1 m) of water near Midland, Ontario.		
Manasoo	Canada	1928	Discovered 200 feet (61 m) below the Georgian Bay in excellent condition with a 1927 Chevrolet Coupe inside.		
Mapledawn		30 November 1924	This steel freighter ran aground in a snow storm on the west side of Christian Island near Midland, Ontario. She is in 35 feet (11 m) of water with part of the stem sticking out of the water.		
Marine City	United States	28 August 1880	Sidewheel steamer passenger vessel. Caught on fire and quickly burnt down to the waterline. All crew survived; 5 of 150 passengers lost. Wreck sits in 3 feet (0.91 m) of water, just north of Sturgeon Point Light.	44°46'14.2"N 83°17'22.0"W	
Metamora	Canada	30 September 1907	A wooden tug that burned to the waterline near Pointe au Baril, Georgian Bay.	45°31′43.39″N 80°24′26.61″W	
Michigan		November 1943	While removing grain from the stranded Riverton at the northwest end of Hope Island near Midland, Ontario, high winds blew her into shallow waters grounding her in 20 feet (6.1 m) of water.		
Minnedosa	Canada	20 October 1905	Sank while in tow, near Harbor Beach, Michigan; Nine crew and passengers lost.		
Monohansett		23 November 1907	The wooden steam barge sank after catching fire near Thunder Bay Island in Lake Huron. As the wreck took place near the island's Life Saving Station, there were no deaths.	45°01′59.76″N 83°11′59.28″W	
Monrovia	Liberia	26 May 1959	A cargo ship that collided with Royalston north of Thunder Bay Island.	44°35′25″N 82°33′12″W	
Nyanza	United States	8 August 1919	Started leaking and became beached, later abandoned.		
Ohio	United States	26 September 1894	A wooden freighter that sank in a collision with the schooner Ironton.		
Philo Scoville		October 1889	Wrecked during a storm and is in 100 feet (30 m) of water at north east end of Bonnet Island near Tobermory, Ontario.		
Regina	Canada	10 November 1913	Lost on Lake Huron during the Great Lakes Storm of 1913.		
R. G. Coburn		19 October 1871	A passenger and cargo freighter that sank in a storm.		
Searchlight	United States	23 April 1907	A fishing tug lost with crew of six In November 1913 some of the wreckage and the remains of an unknown crewman were found at Harbor Beach after the Great Lakes Storm of 1913		
Sweepstakes	Canada	September 1885	A schooner that was damaged off Cove Island in August, then sank a month later in Big Tub Harbour, near Tobermory.	45°15′18″N 81°40′50″W	
True North II	Canada	16 June 2000	A glass-bottomed tour boat that sank in Georgian Bay, killing two students.		
Typo		14 October 1899	The wooden three-masted schooner was run down by the steamer W.P. Ketcham. The ship sank immediately and three of the seven crew on board drowned.	45°24′55″N 83°33′51″W	
Water Witch		11 November 1863	A passenger steamer that sank in Saginaw bay after encountering a gale.		
Waubuno	Canada	22 November 1879	A side-wheel paddle steamer lost in a storm in Georgian Bay.	45°07′15″N 80°09′58″W	
Wexford	United Kingdom	9 November 1913	Lost on Lake Huron during the Great Lakes Storm of 1913.		
W. L. Wetmore		November 1901	Wrecked in a storm at the west end of Bonnet Island in about 30 feet (9.1 m) of water, near Tobermory, Ontario.		

== Lake Erie ==
Ship	Flag	Sunk date	Notes	Coordinates	Image
17 Fathom wreck			Lying on a silt bottom at 105 feet (32 m)	42°39′N 80°03′W	
Admiral	United States	2 December 1942	Towing the barge Cleveco, she encountered a heavy gale and began to founder. She radioed in, but the United States Coast Guard was unable to locate her in the murk before she went down with a loss of 14 people. Owned by Cleveland Tankers, Cleveland. Wreck located by a commercial diver in 1969.	41°38′N 81°54′W	
Adventure	United States	7 October 1903	The sand dredge sank off Kelley's Island following a fire.	41°38′N 82°41′W	
Algeria	United States	5 May 1906	The schooner broke apart in a storm.	41°31′N 81°42′W	
Alva B.	United States	1 November 1917	The tug ran aground off Avon Point in a storm.	41°30′N 82°01′W	
America	United States	5 April 1854	The sidewheel steamer ran aground on Pelee Island.	41°49′N 82°38′W	
Amaretta Mosher	United States	23 November 1902	The schooner sank in a storm near Port Clinton.		
Andrew B	Canada	8 November 1995			
Angler		1893	A tug that caught fire and sank in Long Point.		
Anthony Wayne	United States	28 April 1850	A wooden-hulled paddle steamer that sank after her boilers exploded. An estimated 70 lives were lost. She is the oldest steamboat wreck on the Great Lakes.	41°31.00′N 82°23.00′W	
Atlantic	United States	20 August 1852	Paddlewheel steamer rammed and sunk off Long Point in the fifth-worst single-vessel disaster to ever occur on the Great Lakes.	42°30′N 80°05′W	
Arches	United States	11 November 1852	Also known as Oneida, the package freighter sank in a storm off Long Point.	42°27′N 80°01′W	
Argo	United States	20 October 1937	The tank barge sank off Pelee Island with a cargo of heavy crude and benzole; considered one of the greatest pollution risks on the Great Lakes. Discovered in 2015.	41°38′N 82°30′W	
Armenia	United States	8 May 1906	The schooner barge sank after springing a leak		
Aycliffe Hall	Canada	11 November 1936	Sank off Long Point.		
Bay Coal Schooner		mid 1800s	The schooner suddenly sank off Bay Village, Ohio. Wreck believed to be Industry, which sank in 1874.	41°33′N 81°56′W	
Bow Cabin				41°56′N 82°14′W	
British Lion		4 October 1877	Ran aground off Long Point. The same storm claimed Mediera and Elize A. Turner.		
Brown Brothers	Canada	28 October 1959	Sank off Long Point.	42°37′N 80°00′W	
Brunswick	United States	12 November 1881	The steamer sank following a collision with the schooner Carlingford	42°35′N 79°24′W	
Canobie	Canada	1 November 1921	The steamer sank in a storm near Erie.	42°10′N 80°00′W	
Carlingford	United States	12 November 1881	The schooner sank following a collision with the steamer Brunswick.	42°39′N 79°28′W	
Cascade	United States	24 January 1904	The tug sank after encountering ice.	41°28′N 82°11′W	
Case	Canada	5 January 1917	The bulk carrier ran aground on East Sister Island.		
C.B. Benson		14 October 1893	Sank in a massive gale on her way to Detroit.	42°46′N 79°14′W	
C.B. Lockwood	United States	13 October 1902	Discovered to have sunk below Lake Erie's bottom.	41°56′N 81°23′W	
Cecil J.	Canada	27 May 1944	The tugboat was scuttled after it caught fire.	42°45′N 80°13′W	
Charger	United States	31 July 1890	The schooner sank following a collision.		
Charles B. Packard	United States	16 September 1906	Sank after striking the wreck of the schooner barge Armenia		
Charles H. Davis	United States	13 June 1903	The wooden steamer sank after springing a leak near Cleveland	41°30′N 81°43′W	
Charles Foster	United States	9 December 1900	The bulk barge sank in a gale near Erie	42°10′N 80°15′W	
Charles Spademan	United States	10 December 1909			
Chesapeake	United States	9 June 1847			
Chicago Board of Trade	United States	11 November 1900	The schooner sank in a storm.		
City of Concord	United States	29 September 1906	The steamer sank north of Huron, Ohio in a storm.		
City of Dresden	Canada	18 November 1922	Ran aground off Long Point.		
City of Venice	United States	4 August 1902	Sank in a collision with the steamer Seguin.		
Clarion	United States	8 December 1909	The passenger ship ran aground in a heavy gale and burned on the southeast shoal of Lake Erie.		
Cleveco	United States	3 December 1942	While barge Cleveco was being towed by the tug Admiral, the tug-barge combination encountered a heavy gale. The tug sank first, and then the barge foundered.	41°47′N 81°36′W	
Colonel Cook	United States	9 September 1894	The schooner ran aground near Avon Lake.		
Colonial	Canada	13 November 1914	The wooden steamer stranded and broke up.		
Conemaugh	United States	21 November 1906	The passenger and package freighter ran aground in a gale off Pt Pele.		
Cortland	United States	21 June 1868	The schooner sank after being rammed by the sidewheeler Morning Star.		
Constitution	United States	20 September 1906	The schooner sank near Kellys Island after springing a leak.		
Cracker					
Craftsman	United States	3 June 1958	The barge foundered off Avon Point.	41°31′N 82°00′W	
Crete				42°10′N 80°00′W	
C.H. Plummer	United States	21 November 1888	The scow burnt and sank off of Kellys Island.		
Crystal					
Custodian					
C. W Elphicke	United States	21 October 1913	Ran aground off Long Point.		
David Stewart	United States	10 October 1893	The schooner broke apart in a storm in Pigeon Bay after trying to take shelter from a storm.		
David Vance	United States	19 July 1893	The schooner sank after a collision with the barge Lizzie.		
Dean Richmond	United States	14 October 1893	The steamer sank near Erie	42°17′N 79°55′W	
Detroiter					
D.L. Filer	United States	19 October 1916	Sank during the Black Friday Storm		
Dominion	Canada	28 October 1892	The dredger sank south of Wheatley Harbor while under tow.		
Dundee	United States	9 November 1900	The schooner foundered in a gale while under tow by the steamer John N. Glinnden.	41°41′N 81°50′W	
Dunkirk Schooner Site	Unknown		An early unidentified schooner lying off Dunkirk, New York	42°33′0″N 79°36′0″W	
Duke Luedtke	United States	21 September 1993	The tug capsized and sank after springing a leak.	41°41′N 81°57′W	
Eldorado	United States	20 November 1880	Sank off the mouth of Erie harbor.	42°10′N 80°00′W	
Edmond Fitzgerald	United States	14 November 1883	Ran aground off Long Point.		
Eliza R. Turner	United States	10 October 1877	Ran aground off Long Point. The same storm claimed the British Lion and Madiera.		
Empire	United States	16 November 1870	Ran aground off Long Point.		
Erie	United States	9 August 1841	Caught fire and sank.		
Erieau Quarry Stone				42°15′N 81°54′W	
Exchange	United States	21 November 1874	The schooner ran aground on Kelleys Island		
F.A. Meyer	United States	18 December 1909	The wooden bulk carrier sank after ice cutting into the hull.	41°55′N 82°02′W	
Fanny L. Jones	United States	10 August 1890	The schooner sank in a storm near Cleveland.	41°30′N 81°43′W	
F.H. Prince	United States	18 August 1911	The dredger sank east of Kelleys Island.		
Fintry	United States	8 November 1855	Sank following a boiler explosion off Port Stanley.		
Frank E. Vigor	United States	27 April 1944	The bulk carrier sank in a collision off Pt. Pele	41°57′N 81°57′W	
General Franz Sigel	United States	18 July 1903	The schooner sank near Monroe after springing a lake.		
George Dunbar	United States	29 June 1902	The bulk carrier sank off Kelleys Island.	41°40′N 82°33′W	
George Stone	United States	13 October 1909	The bulk carrier ran aground off Pt Pele		
George Worthington	United States	23 July 1887	The schooner sank after a collision.		
Goudreau	United States	23 November 1917	The steam freighter, launched in 1889 as and until 1917 named Pontiac, lost rudder and driven ashore 5 miles southwest of Lyal Island. No fatalities; abandoned to underwriters.		
G. P. Griffith	United States	18 June 1850	Between 241 and 289 lives lost when the ship caught fire. Third-greatest loss of life in any Great Lakes shipping disaster.		
Grand Traverse	United States	20 October 1896	The bulk carrier sank in a collision with the Livingstone.		
H.A. Barr	Canada	24 August 1902	The barge sank off Point Stanley.	42°09′N 81°23′W	
Henry Clay	United States	24 October 1851	The passenger and package freighter grounded off of Long Point.		
Henry Roop	United States	12 October 1843	A schooner lost in a storm.		
H.G. Cleveland	United States	August 1899	A three-mast schooner carrying stone that sprang a leak and sank four miles (6.4 km) off of Lorain. Rescued by City of Detroit and the tugboat Thomas Matham, everyone survived.		
Hickory Stick	United States	29 November 1958	The derrick barge broke apart and sank in a storm.	41°32′N 82°06′W	
Howard S. Gerken	United States	21 August 1926	The sand dredge sank in a storm near Erie.		
Idaho	United States	4 November 1897	Sank off Long Point in a gale storm. Of a crew of 21, 2 survived 19 died		
Idler	United States	7 July 1900	Sank 16 miles (26 km) northwest of Cleveland during a gale, with negligence a contributing factor. Six of seven passengers drowned. Raised, towed to Cleveland.		
Indiana	United States	5 December 1848	Ran aground and burned off Conneaut.	42°17′N 79°59′W	
Isabella J. Boyce	United States	June 1917	A sandsucker which grounded on Middle Bass Island in Lake Erie, caught fire, and sank in 10 feet (3.0 m) of water. There were no deaths.		
Issac W. Nicholson	United States	20 August 1873	The schooner foundered south of Point Pelee		
Ivanhoe	United States	10 April 1855	The schooner sank after a collision with the schooner Arab.	41°33′N 82°02′W	
James B. Colgate	United States	20 October 1916	A whaleback steamer that sank off Long Point, in a storm that also took Merida and Marshall F Butters. 25 people were killed with one survivor. Wreckage was located in 1991.	42°05′N 81°44′W	
James H. Reed	United States	27 April 1944	Sank in a collision with Ashcroft		
Jay Gould	United States	18 July 1918	The bulk carrier sank in a storm near Pt Pelee.	41°51′N 82°24′W	
Jennie P. King	United States	18 June 1866	Foundered off Long Point.		
Jersey City	United States	23 November 1860	Foundered off Long Point.		
J.G. McGrath	(United Kingdom of Great Britain and Ireland) Canada	28 October 1878	Foundered off Long Point.	42°40′N 79°23′W	
J.J. Boland Jr.	Canada	5 October 1932	The bulk carrier sank near Westfield due to her hatches being open.	42°22′N 79°43′W	
John B. Griffin		12 July 1890	The tug burned and sank.		
John B. Lyon	United States	12 September 1900	The wooden bulk carrier foundered off Conneaut in the same storm that took the Dundee.		
John J. Barlum	United States	18 September 1922	The schooner barge sank off of Kellys Island.		
John Pridgeon Jr.	United States	18 September 1908	The wooden lumber carrier sprung a leak and sank off Cleveland after encountering a storm.	41°35′N 81°58′W	
Jorge B.	Canada	19 September 1983	The fishing vessel sank off Pt Pele.		
Joseph Paige	United States	14 October 1893	Ran aground off Long Point, in a gale that also took Wocoken.		
Lawrence		1921	Ran aground off Long Point.		
Lake Serpent		1829	The schooner disappeared en route to Cleveland with a load of limestone. Both occupants fell overboard and drowned; their bodies washed ashore just west of Cleveland. The ship was discovered in 2016 and identified in 2019. She is the oldest-confirmed shipwreck in Lake Erie.		
Little Wissahickon	United States	10 July 1896	Sank off Rondeau Point.	41°54′N 81°56′W	
Lycoming	United States	21 October 1910	The steamer burned at her dock in Morpeth.	42°15′N 81°53′W	
Mabel Wilson	United States	26 May 1906	The schooner ran aground on a breakwater after her towline snapped.	41°30′N 81°43′W	
Madiera	United States	10 October 1877	Ran aground off Long Point. The same storm claimed British Lion and Elize A. Turner.		
Magnetic	United States	25 August 1917	Sank off Long Point.		
Margaret Olwill	United States	28 June 1899	Overloaded with limestone, the load shifted during an unexpected June gale and the ship was capsized by waves when the steering chains broke. At least eight people perished. The wreck was discovered in 2017.		
Marquette & Bessemer No. 2	United States	8 December 1909	A car ferry that sank in a storm. Thirty-four to thirty-eight people perished.		
Marshall F. Butters	United States	10 October 1916	A wooden lumber carrier that sank in the same that also took James B. Colgate and Merida.	41°43′N 82°17′W	
Mecosta	United States	29 October 1922	The bulk carrier foundered while under tow near Rocky River.	41°31′N 81°53′W	
Merida	United States	16 October 1916	A Ward Line steamer that sank off Long Point in a storm that also took James B. Colgate and Marshall F. Butters.	42°13′N 81°20′W	
Morania		29 October 1951	Also includes Penobscot. Closest shipwreck to Buffalo River		
M.J. Wilcox	United States	8 May 1906	The schooner sank after spring a leak near Kingsville.		
Morning Star	United States	6 June 1868	The paddle steamer sank after a collision with the barquentine Courtland near Vermilion.	41°36′N 82°12′W	
Mount Vernon	United States	9 October 1860	Sank of Point Pelee		
Mystic		1907	Sank off Long Point.		
New Brunswick	United Kingdom	26 August 1858	Sank off Point Pelee.		
Niagara	United Kingdom	5 December 1899	Ran aground off Long Point.		
North Carolina	United States	9 December 1968	The tug sank of an unknown cause off Mentor.	41°43′N 81°22′W	
Northern Indiana	United States	17 July 1856	Caught fire near Point au Pelee, Lake Erie, while en route from Buffalo to Monroe, Michigan. 56 lives lost.	41°53′N 82°30′W	
Oxford	(United Kingdom of Great Britain and Ireland) Canada	30 May 1856	Sank after a collision off Long Point.	42°28′N 79°51′W	
Paddy Murphy	United States	23 April 1888	The tug caught fire and was beached and burned to the waterline.		
Pascal P. Pratt	United States	1908	Ran aground off Long Point.	42°33′N 80°05′W	
Passaic	United States	1 November 1891	The steamer sank off Dunkirk.	42°28′N 79°27′W	
Penelope	United States	19 December 1909	The tug caught fire and was grounded and burned to the waterline.	41°31′N 82°02′W	
Persian	United States	26 August 1875			
Philip D. Armour	United States	13 November 1915	The barge foundered off Erie after her towline broke.	42°07′N 80°10′W	
Philip Minch	United States	20 November 1904	The bulk carrier burned and sank near Pelee Island.	41°41′N 82°30′W	
Pocahontas		8 April 1862	Foundered off Long Point.		
Queen of the West	United States	8 August 1903	The bulk carrier sank after springing a leak.	41°50′N 82°23′W	
Raleigh	United States	29 November 1911	During a storm, the rudder broke and she ran aground about one mile (1.6 km) off Wildwood Road, Sherkston, Ontario in 30 feet (9.1 m) of water.		
Rebecca Foster	United Kingdom	6 November 1863	Foundered off Long Point.		
Relief	United States	18 July 1884	The tug sank off of Kellys Island.		
Robert	Canada	26 September 1982	The tug sank after a collision off Chatham-Kent.	42.25°N 81.81°W	
Saint Lawerence					
Saint Louis	United States	7 November 1852	The steamer ran aground off Kelleys Island		
Sand Merchant	United States	17 October 1936	The sand dredger sank in a storm off Cleveland.	41°34′N 82°57′W	
Sarah E. Sheldon	United States	20 October 1905	A wooden bulk carrier that struck a reef off Lorain and broke up.	41°29′N 82°06′W	
Sciota	United States	2 September 1864	Sank in a collision with the steamer Arctic		
S.F. Gale	United States	28 November 1876	The schooner foundered off Cleveland.	41°44′N 81°52′W	
Siberia	United States	1883	A schooner that ran aground off Long Point.		
Siberia	United States	20 October 1905	Ran aground off Long Point.		
Sir C.T Van Straubenzie	United States	27 September 1909			
S.K. Martin	United States	12 October 1912	The bulk carrier sank off Erie after her boiler exploded.	42°14′N 79°56′W	
Smith	Canada	25 October 1930	A tugboat that sank under tow off Long Point, Lake Erie.		
Specular	United States	22 August 1900	The bulk carrier sank off Pele Island		
St. James	United States	October 1870	Sank of unknown cause off Long Point in Lake Erie; discovered 1984.	42°27′N 80°07′W	
Success	United States	4 July 1946	The barquentine burned after running aground near Port Clinton	41°31′N 82°54′W	
Sultan	United States	24 September 1864	Lost in a storm off of Cleveland.	41°36′N 81°37′W	
Swallow	United States	19 October 1901	The lumber carrier foundered off Long Point.		
T-8				42°35′N 80°01′W	
Tasmania	United States	20 October 1905	The bulk carrier sank off Pt Pelee.	41°47′N 82°29′W	
Tioga	United States	5 October 1877	The steamer burned and sank in the Pelee Passage		
Tire Reef				42°41′N 80°08′W	
Toledo	United States	19 November 1924			
Trade Wind	United States	30 November 1854	A schooner that collided with Sir Charles Napier off Long Point.	42°25′N 80°12′W	
Two Fannies	United States	10 August 1890	Sank after it developed a leak in heavy seas.	41°33′N 81°55′W	
Unknown				42°08′N 81°37′W	
Valentine	United States	10 October 1877	The schooner foundered in a storm.	41°55′N 81°54′W	
Washington Irving	United States	7 July 1860	Sank off Dunkirk, New York.	42°32′N 79°27′W	
Wessee					
Wild Rover	United States	2 November 1874	Foundered off Long Point, Ontario.		
William H. Vanderbilt	United States	24 September 1883	Ran aground off Long Point, Ontario.		
William H. Stevens	United States	8 September 1902	The bulk carrier burned and sank off Ashtabula.		
Willis	United States	11 November 1872	The schooner sank in a collision with the schooner Elizabeth Jones.		
Wilma	Canada	14 April 1936	The fishing vessel sank off Port Dover	42°42′N 80°02′W	
Wisconsin	United States	24 August 1853			
Wocoken	United States	14 October 1893	Ran aground off Long Point in a gale that also took Joseph Paige.		
W.R. Hannah	United States	14 October 1886	The schooner sank off of Kellys Island		
Young Phoenix	United Kingdom	24 September 1818	Sank off Long Point, Lake Erie.		
Zadock Pratt	United States	20 November 1860	Sank after striking the wreck of the Mount Vernon.		

== Lake Ontario ==
Ship	Flag	Sunk date	Notes	Coordinates	Image
Alberta	Canada	11 March 1918	A lake tug with the appearance of an Alligator tug from the Ottawa River logging days, sank near Bay of Quinte.		
Aloha	Canada	28 October 1917	Sank while in tow of the CW Chamberlain off Nine Mile Point.		
American	Canada	1 October 1894	The schooner sank with a load of coal off Stony Point.		
Annie Falconer	Canada	1904	A schooner that sank in a storm en route to Picton. One crew member perished of exposure upon reaching Amherst Island.		
Ariadne	Canada	30 November 1886	North of North Sandy Pond in shallow water are the remains of Ariadne		
Augustus			A schooner that sank en route to be scuttled during the 1937 Portsmouth harbour cleanup.		
Bay State	United States	4 November 1862	Screw propeller, sank in storm. Wreck discovered August 2015.		
Belle Sheridan	Canada	7 November 1880	A 123-foot (37 m) two-masted schooner. She was carrying coal en route to Toronto when caught in the Gale of 1880 and after fighting for hours, sank in 12 feet (3.7 m) of water in Wellers Bay. Only one of the crew of seven survived.		
Bluebell	Canada	1957	The scow was intentionally sunk as part of the Leslie Spit	43°37′45.5″N 79°20′22.5″W	
Britannic		9 August 1895	Wooden Great Lakes bulk freighter launched in 1888; sank off of Grosse Ile; recovered after sinking in 1895 and returned to service; destroyed by fire in 1926.		
China	Canada	13 October 1872	A small steamer that caught fire and sank off False Duck Island, six months after launching.		
City of New York (1863)	Canada	26 November 1921	The lake freighter sank in a storm off Main Duck Island with the loss of eight lives.		
City of Sheboygan	Canada	25 September 1925	Sank in a storm off Amherst Island with the loss of five people.		
Comet		14 May 1861	A paddlewheeler that sank in a collision with the schooner Exchange' off Nine Mile Point, with the loss of two lives.		
Congercoal	Canada	5 November 1917	Inside Little Sodus Bay along Fair Haven Beach State Park's western shoreline. Just off the parking lot and south of the boat launch.		
Cormorant		16 or 17 October 1958	Northwest of Mary Kay and northeast of David W. Mills in 165 feet (50 m) of water		
Cornwall		1931	A paddlewheeler scuttled in the Amherst Island graveyard.		
Cortez		12 November 1880	Directly off of Southwick Beach State Park.		
Dagger-board			A schooner near Galloo Island.		
David W. Mills	United States	8 November 1919	The wooden lake freighter ran aground on a reef and was broken apart by waves over time.		
Dominion	Canada	20 November 1879			
Dredge Islander			A dredge scuttled in the Snake Island graveyard after harbour cleanup in the 1930s.		
Dupont Salvage Scow			Scuttled near Dupont Point, perhaps after the Elevator Bay cleanup.		
Effie Mae		1993	A charter boat that was scuttled beside Aloha for a diving attraction		
Ellsworth	United States	9 July 1877	The steamer caught fire and burned off Stony Point.		
Empress	Canada	18 March 1868	A steamer scuttled in the Amherst Island Graveyard. Real name unknown.		
Etta Belle	United States	9 March 1873	Directly outside of Sodus Bay harbor on the eastern side of the harbor entrance in shallow water.		
Frontenac		5 December 1929	Tug.		
George A. Marsh	Canada	17 August 1917	A schooner that was sunk during a heavy gale off Pigeon Island. Twelve of fourteen crew and passengers died.		
George T Davie		18 April 1945	Barge.		
Glendora		19 November 1887	A steamer that was scuttled in the Amherst Island Graveyard. Real name unknown.		
USS Hamilton	United States Navy	8 August 1813	A US Navy schooner that sank in a squall off Fourteen Mile Creek, Oakville.		
Hartford	United States	11 October 1894	Near North Sandy Pond, part of the ship has also washed ashore on the North Sandy Pond Barrier Bar.		
H. B.	Canada	17 October 1912	A schooner barge in eastern Lake Ontario 20 miles (32 km) off the Oswego shoreline		
Henry Roney	Canada	24 October 1879	Directly in front of Webster, New York in 70 feet (21 m) of water.	43°15′47″N 77°33′20″W	
Hiawatha		20 September 1917	A schooner barge in 95 feet (29 m) of water; wreck discovered in September 2017.		
Hilda			Wrecker.		
House boat			Located in Chaumont Bay		
James H. Shrigley		18 August 1920	A coal barge on Wautoma Shoals in shallow water.		
J.W. Langmuir	Canada	7 October 1875	The schooner sank with a load of Lumber off Gallo Island.		
Katie Eccles		28 November 1922	Ran aground near Kingston on Lake Ontario.		
KPH Wreck			A flat barge 30 meters (98 ft) long that sank near Kingston Psychiatric Hospital.		
Laura Grace		1918	A steamer directly in front of Long Pond Outlet in Greece, New York.		
Londonderry			Wrecker.		
Maple Glen			Steamer.		
Marine Museum 2			Scow.		
Mark One			Tug.		
Mary Kay	Canada	1 September 1988	In 54 feet (16 m) of water just northeast of Snake Creek.		
Menominee			Northeastern Lake Ontario off Galloo Island.		
Milan	United States	10 November 1849	A schooner directly in front of Oak Orchard, New York in deep water.		
Monkey Wrench			A schooner that was scuttled in the Amherst Island Graveyard. Real name unknown.		
Montreal		26 June 1857	Passenger steamer that caught fire and sank near Cape Roque. 264 people, mostly European emigrants, were killed.		
Munson	Canada	30 April 1890	A dredger that sank in 4 minutes due to leaking plank, off Lemoine Point.		
Nisbet Grammer	United Kingdom	26 May 1926	A lake freighter that sank in a collision with Dalwarnic off Somerset.		
North Star	Canada	26 November 1886	The schooner sank with a load of coal off Stony Island.		
Ocean Wave	United States	30 April 1853	Paddlewheeler.		
Old Steamer			Eastern Lake Ontario in 90 feet (27 m) of water		
Olive Branch	Canada	30 September 1880	Schooner		
Oliver Mowat	Canada	1 September 1921	Schooner		
Onondaga	Canada	5 November 1907	A schooner off Stony Point, New York.		
HMS Ontario	Royal Navy	31 October 1780	A British 22-gun brig-sloop sank in a storm on Lake Ontario, discovered in 2008. The oldest shipwreck ever found on the Great Lakes.		
Orcadian		8 May 1858	Directly outside of Sodus Bay harbor on the western side of the harbor entrance in shallow water.		
Perseverance	Canada	6 October 1868	A steamer directly in front of Pultneyville, New York in deep water.		
Queen Mary			A steamer that was scuttled in the Amherst Island Graveyard. Real name unknown.		
R.H. Rae		4 August 1858	Schooner.		
Ricky's Tug			Scuttled in the Amherst Island Graveyard. Real name unknown.		
Ridgetown	United States	1974	The retired lake freighter was sunk as a breakwater off Mississauga, Ontario.		
Robert Bruce	United States	12 November 1835	Near North Sandy Pond.		
St. Peter	United States	27 October 1898	Northeast of the Pultneyville Outer Range rear light in 117 feet (36 m) of water.		
USS Scourge	United States Navy	8 August 1813	A US Navy schooner that sank in a squall off Fourteen Mile Creek, Oakville.		
S.M. Douglas			A former White Star dredger.		
HMS Speedy	Royal Navy	8 October 1804	A schooner that sank off Brighton, Lake Ontario.	43.814°N 76.789°W	
HMS St Lawrence	Royal Navy		A wooden warship that served in the War of 1812. The ship was decommissioned and her hull was used as a storage facility by Morton's Brewery in Kingston. In January 1832, the hull was sold to Robert Drummond for £25. Later, it was sunk close to shore, and is now a popular diving attraction.	44°13′14″N 76°30′18″W	
St. Peter		27 October 1898	A schooner that was wrecked near Pultneyville.	43°18′42″N 77°7′52″W	
USS Sylph	United States Navy	1823	A schooner that served in the War of 1812.		
Terry's Tug			Tug.		
The Porter			Inside Little Sodus Bay along the break wall separating the lake from the bay on the east side of the channel.		
The T. J. Waffle			A steamer 27 miles (43 km) off Oswego, New York.		
HMS Toronto	Royal Navy	1811	A schooner that sank off Hanlan's Point, Toronto Islands, Lake Ontario.		
Twin unidentified wrecks	Unknown		East of the eastern break wall entering Rochester harbor in shallow water.		
Undine	Canada	1 November 1890	Northeast of Wautoma Shoals in 40 feet (12 m) of water.		
Unidentified wreck	Unknown		Northeast of Rochester harbor breakwalls in 40 feet (12 m) of water.		
Unknown				43°27′N 77°26′W	
US Coast Guard Boat 56022	United States Coast Guard	1 December 1977	Sank during a violent storm en route from Oswego to Niagara. Between Ontario on the Lake and Pultneyville in front of the submerged pipeline in 32 feet (9.8 m) of water.	43°17′48″N 77°19′32″W	
Washington		1803	Commercial sloop owned by Canadians, built by Americans on Lake Erie, sank off Oswego.		
Waterlily			Steam barge.		
William Elgin	Canada	19 May 1888			
William Jamieson	Canada	15 May 1923	Schooner.		
William Johnston			A tug that sank off 9-Mile Point.	44°07′N 76°33′W	
Wisconsin		21 May 1867			
HMS Wolfe (later HMS Montreal)	Royal Navy		A freshwater sloop of war that served in the War of 1812. She was ordered broken up and sold in 1831, and is presumed to have rotted and sunk at Kingston. The wreck, identified as HMS Montreal by Parks Canada in 2006, lies near the Royal Military College of Canada.	44°13′N 76°27′W	
Wolfe Islander II	Canada	21 September 1985	Car ferry scuttled to provide scuba attraction off Dawson's Point, Wolfe Island		

== See also ==
- Graveyard of the Great Lakes
- List of Great Lakes shipwrecks on the National Register of Historic Places
