= List of shipwrecks in June 1868 =

The list of shipwrecks in June 1868 includes ships sunk, foundered, grounded, or otherwise lost during June 1868.

== 1 June ==
List of shipwrecks: 1 June 1868
Ship	State	Description
Princess	United States	The sternwheel paddle steamer sank in the Missouri River at Napoleon, Missouri, at 39.1332°N 94.0735°W

== 2 June ==
List of shipwrecks: 2 June 1868
Ship	State	Description
Cardiganshire	United Kingdom	The ship ran aground at Harrison's Point, Barbados. She was on a voyage from Barbados to London. She was refloated and resumed her voyage.

== 3 June ==
List of shipwrecks: 3 June 1868
Ship	State	Description
Alarm	United Kingdom	The ship was driven ashore at Southend, Essex.
Breeze	United States	The ship collided with Dhollerah (India) and sank in The Downs with the loss of one life. She was on a voyage from Portland, Maine to London, United Kingdom.
Fidelity	United Kingdom	The ship struck a sunken rock at Bayble. Isle of Lewis, Outer Hebrides and sank. Her crew survived.
Sirdar	Norway	The ship was driven ashore at Southend.

== 4 June ==
List of shipwrecks: 4 June 1868
Ship	State	Description
Shalun	Imperial Russian Navy	The gunboat ran aground, broke in two and sank off "Biorke Island" with the loss of seven of the 32 people on board. She was towing the barge No. 11 (Russia) from Kronstadt to Helsinki, Grand Duchy of Finland. The barge was undamaged. Survivors were rescued on 6 June by the paddle frigate Olaf (Imperial Russian Navy).

== 5 June ==
List of shipwrecks: 5 June 1868
Ship	State	Description
Phrenologist	United Kingdom	The ship was wrecked at New Calabar, Africa. Her crew were rescued. She was on a voyage from Liverpool, Lancashire to New Calabar.

== 6 June ==
List of shipwrecks: 6 June 1868
Ship	State	Description
Farmer	United Kingdom	The smack foundered in Spey Bay. Her crew were rescued. She was on a voyage from Ballachulish, Inverness-shire to Leith, Lothian.
Gowrie	United Kingdom	The ship was driven ashore in Loch Hay, Isle of Skye, Outer Hebrides. She was on a voyage from Runcorn, Cheshire to Morrison's Haven, Lothian.
Mischief	United Kingdom	The ship was driven ashore on Flotta, Orkney Islands. She was on a voyage from South Shields, County Durham to Dublin.

== 8 June ==
List of shipwrecks: 8 June 1868
Ship	State	Description
Advance, and Queen Emma	United Kingdom	The steamship Advance ran into the schooner Queen Emma off Vlissingen, Zeeland, Netherlands. Both vessels were severely damaged and put in to Antwerp, Belgium for repairs.
Evening Star	Canada	The tug capsized and sank in Lake Huron off Goderich, Ontario with the loss of two lives.
Gem	United Kingdom	The ship ran aground on the Longsand, in the North Sea off the cost of Essex and capsized. Her crew were rescued. She was on a voyage from South Shields, County Durham to Plymouth, Devon.

== 9 June ==
List of shipwrecks: 9 June 1868
Ship	State	Description
Louisa	(United Kingdom of Great Britain and Ireland) New Zealand	The 13-ton schooner foundered off Greymouth during a gale, with the loss of all three on board.

== 10 June ==
List of shipwrecks: 10 June 1868
Ship	State	Description
Norden	United Kingdom	The ship was driven ashore on Tybee Island, Georgia, United States. She was on a voyage from Swansea, Glamorgan to London.

== 11 June ==
List of shipwrecks: 11 June 1868
Ship	State	Description
Atlantic	United Kingdom	The ship sprang a leak and was beached at Vigo, Spain. She was on a voyage from Alexandria, Egypt to Liverpool, Lancashire.
Istria	United Kingdom	The ship was wrecked on the Hatteras Shoals with the loss of 27 of her crew. She was on a voyage from New Orleans, Louisiana, United States to Liverpool.
May Queen	United Kingdom	The ship was wrecked in the Manning River.
Mary Agnes	United Kingdom	The tug sank in the River Mersey. She was refloated on 15 June.
Montgomery	United Kingdom	The ship was abandoned in the Atlantic Ocean. Her crew were rescued by Shawmut (United States). Montgomery was on a voyage from Pensacola, Florida to Queenstown, County Cork. She was towed in to Charleston, South Carolina in a derelict condition on 4 July.
Neptune's Bride	United Kingdom	The ship was driven ashore at "Junara". She was on a voyage from South Shields, County Durham to Alexandria.

== 12 June ==
List of shipwrecks: 12 June 1868
Ship	State	Description
Betsey Williams	United Kingdom	The ship was wrecked on "Blarke Kallard", near "Ratham", Sweden.
Marie Eleanor	France	The brig foundered in the Mediterranean Sea 60 nautical miles (110 km) west of Gozo, Malta. Her nine crew were rescued by the barque Fieramosca (Italy). Marie Cleonie was on a voyage from Agrigento, Sicily, Italy to Hamburg.

== 13 June ==
List of shipwrecks: 13 June 1868
Ship	State	Description
Andubon	Spain	The ship was wrecked at Manila, Spanish East Indies. She was on a voyage from Manila to Cebu.
Despatch	(United Kingdom of Great Britain and Ireland) New Zealand	The 98-ton brigantine was driven ashore by a heavy sea just to the north of Timaru, with the loss of the ship's master, J. E. Driver.

== 14 June ==
List of shipwrecks: 14 June 1868
Ship	State	Description
Northumberland	United Kingdom	The barque ran aground off Bald Head. She was on a voyage from Newcastle, New South Wales to Albany, Colony of Western Australia. She was abandoned on 19 June.

== 15 June ==
List of shipwrecks: 15 June 1868
Ship	State	Description
Erato	United Kingdom	The ship was damaged by fire at Blackwall, Middlesex.
Fame	United Kingdom	The ship ran aground in the Dardanelles. She was run into on 20 June by Uranus (United Kingdom) and was damaged.
Himalaya	United Kingdom	The ship ran aground on the Tullah Sand, in the Hooghly River. She was on a voyage from Calcutta, India to Mauritius. She was refloated on 21 June.
Julia	United Kingdom	The ship ran aground on the Goodwin Sands, Kent. She was on a voyage from London to Plymouth, Devon. She was refloated and resumed her voyage.

== 16 June ==
List of shipwrecks: 16 June 1868
Ship	State	Description
Negress	United Kingdom	The barque was wrecked at "Yeskie Pine", 45 nautical miles (83 km) east of Lagos, Africa. Her crew were rescued.

== 17 June ==
List of shipwrecks: 17 June 1868
Ship	State	Description
San Francisco de Paolo	Italy	The ship ran aground on a reef off Gonaïves, Haiti. She was on a voyage from Port-au-Prince, Haiti to Falmouth, Cornwall, United Kingdom. She was refloated and resumed her voyage, but subsequently sprang a leak and put in to Nassau, Bahamas on 25 June. She was condemned and sold to her captain, an act which it was alleged was fraudulent. Lloyd's Salvage Association got involved in the case. San Francisco de Paolo was made fit for sea with assistance from HMS Barracouta (Royal Navy) with the intention of taking her to an English port.

== 18 June ==
List of shipwrecks: 18 June 1868
Ship	State	Description
Afrika	Netherlands	The ship departed from Banana, Africa for Rotterdam, South Holland. No further trace, presumed foundered with the loss of all hands.
Eliza Blake	United Kingdom	The ship ran aground off Arthurstown, County Waterford. She was won a voyage from Waterford to Neath, Glamorgan. She was refloated and put back to Waterford.

== 19 June ==
List of shipwrecks: 19 June 1868
Ship	State	Description
Audubon	United Kingdom	The ship was driven ashore and wrecked near Manila, Spanish East Indies. She was on a voyage from Manila to Zebu, Spanish East Indies.
Navigator	Flag unknown	The schooner ran aground on the Haisborough Sands, in the North Sea off the coast of Norfolk, United Kingdom. She was refloated and towed in to Great Yarmouth, Norfolk.
Schaloune	Imperial Russian Navy	The gunboat was wrecked in the Gulf of Finland with the loss of seven of her 27 crew. Survivors were rescued by Olaf (Imperial Russian Navy).

== 20 June ==
List of shipwrecks: 20 June 1868
Ship	State	Description
Alicia	United Kingdom	The barque was wrecked at Kurrachee, India. Her crew were rescued. She was on a voyage from Liverpool, Lancashire to Kurrachee.
Bernardo	Italy	The full-rigged ship sprang a leak and foundered in the Mediterranean Sea off the coast of Sardinia. Her crew were rescued by the barque Adria Padre (Italy). Bernardo was on a voyage from Sulina, Ottoman Empire to Cork and/or Queenstown, County Cork, United Kingdom.
Cortland, and Morning Star	United States	The barque Cortland collided with the steamship Morning Star in Lake Huron and both vessels sank. Sixty-three of the thirteen crew on board Courtland and 70 people on board Morning Star were rescued, twenty were reported missing. Morning Star was on a voyage from Cleveland, Ohio to Detroit, Michigan.
General Athelin	France	The ship was wrecked on Inagua, Bahamas. She was on a voyage from Santiago de Cuba, Cuba to Havre de Grâce, Seine-Inférieure.
Marie Louise	United Kingdom	The ship struck the West Mouse Sandbank, in Liverpool Bay and sank. She was on a voyage from Poole, Dorset to Runcorn, Cheshire.
Northumberland	United Kingdom	The ship foundered 10 nautical miles (19 km) off Breaksea Island, Colony of Western Australia. Her crew were rescued. She was on a voyage from Newcastle upon Tyne, Northumberland to Albany, Western Australia.
Sedburgh	United Kingdom	The ship ran aground off the coast of South Carolina, United States. She was on a voyage from Charleston, South Carolina to Liverpool, Lancashire. She was refloated and put back to Charleston.
Uranus	United Kingdom	The ship collided with Fame (United Kingdom) in the Dardanelles and was severely damaged.

== 21 June ==
List of shipwrecks: 21 June 1868
Ship	State	Description
Mastland	United Kingdom	The ship ran aground on the Ariadne Rock. She was on a voyage from Shanghai, China to London. She was refloated and put back to Shanghai.

== 24 June ==
List of shipwrecks: 24 June 1868
Ship	State	Description
Selma	United States	The steamship foundered in the Gulf of Mexico south of Galveston, Texas, off the mouth of the Brazos River.

== 25 June ==
List of shipwrecks: 25 June 1868
Ship	State	Description
Foces	United Kingdom	The ship capsized whilst being towed from the River Tyne to the River Wear. She was righted.
Horatio	United Kingdom	The Barking smack was run down and sunk by the steamship Saxonia (Hamburg) off the Dutch coast with the loss of six of her eight crew.
Unanimity	United Kingdom	The ship was driven ashore on Fårö, Sweden. She had been refloated by 27 June and resumed her voyage.

== 26 June ==
List of shipwrecks: 26 June 1868
Ship	State	Description
Allport	United Kingdom	The ship was destroyed by fire in the English Channel 40 nautical miles (74 km) south of The Lizard, Cornwall. Her crew were rescued by Alexandra (United Kingdom). Allport was on a voyage from Sines, Portugal to Riga, Russia.
HMS Beacon	Royal Navy	The Beacon-class gunvessel ran aground in the Paraná River. She was refloated.
Shahazadah	United Kingdom	The steamship was driven ashore and wrecked at Cox's Bazar India. She was on a voyage from Chittagong to Bombay, India.

== 27 June ==
List of shipwrecks: 27 June 1868
Ship	State	Description
Bloomer	United Kingdom	The schooner was driven ashore at Rock Point, Maryland.
Enterprise	United Kingdom	The ship was driven ashore on Seal Island, Nova Scotia, Canada. She was on a voyage from Saint John, New Brunswick, Canada to Queenstown, County Cork.
Mary	(United Kingdom of Great Britain and Ireland) Isle of Man	The ship ran aground on the Burbo Bank, in Liverpool Bay and was abandoned by her crew. She was on a voyage from Liverpool, Lancashire to Holyhead, Anglesey. She was refloated and towed in to Liverpool by Alert (United Kingdom).
Whinfell	United Kingdom	The ship was driven ashore at Hong Kong.

== 28 June ==
List of shipwrecks: 28 June 1868
Ship	State	Description
Kilblain	United Kingdom	The barque caught fire off the coast of Santo Domingo on her maiden voyage from London to Matanzas, Cuba, carrying coal. The master and 13 crew were rescued and taken to Cárdenas, Cuba

== 30 June ==
List of shipwrecks: 30 June 1868
Ship	State	Description
Teaser	United Kingdom	The schooner ran aground on the Long Rock, off Ballywalter, County Down. She was on a voyage from Maryport, Cumberland to Belfast, County Antrim.

== Unknown date ==
List of shipwrecks: Unknown date in June 1868
Ship	State	Description
Canning	United Kingdom	The ship ran aground on the Bulcherry Sand, off "Mutlah" before 26 June.
Duke of Argyll	United Kingdom	The ship ran aground on the Tullah Sand, in the Hooghly River. She was on a voyage from London to Calcutta, India.
Elida	United Kingdom	The ship foundered. Her crew were rescued. She was on a voyage from Stettin to an English port.
General Butler	United States	The fishing schooner was lost on the Georges Bank, possibly run over by a ship. Lost with all 10 hands.
Hancock	United Kingdom	The brigantine was wrecked in the Cayman Islands.
James Childs	United Kingdom	The barque capsized off the mouth of the Indus with the loss of two lives.
Margaret Langdon	United Kingdom	The ship foundered before 17 June with the loss of two of her crew. Survivors were rescued by the barque Charles and Edward (United Kingdom). Margaret Langdon was on a voyage from Swansea, Glamorgan to Valparaíso, Chile.
Montgomery	United Kingdom	The ship was abandoned in the Atlantic Ocean before 11 June. She was towed in to Savannah, Georgia, United States.
Moses Waring	United States	The ship was abandoned in the Atlantic Ocean before 30 June.
Onda	United Kingdom	The ship was abandoned in the Atlantic Ocean. Her crew were rescued. She was on a voyage from the Clyde to Quebec City, Canada.
Pavadetta	United Kingdom	The ship sank at Dry Island. She was on a voyage from Berbice, British Guiana to London.
Richard Hobson	United Kingdom	The ship foundered off "Cape Lukkah", Egypt. Her crew survived. She was on a voyage from Sunderland, County Durham to Alexandria, Egypt.
Rowland	United Kingdom	The brig was wrecked in the Caicos Islands.
Serafina Tatham	United Kingdom	The ship was driven ashore at Cape Nassau. She was on a voyage from Cardiff, Glamorgan to Demerara, British Guiana. She was refloated after eleven days and resumed her voyage.
Sissebo	United Kingdom	The ship was driven ashore and wrecked on the Isla de Juventud, Cuba before 9 June.
St. Bernard	France	The barque was driven from her moorings at Madras, India. She collided with Anglia (United Kingdom) and sank. The wreck was dispersed by explosives.
Ville de Lyon	France	The ship caught fire in the Mediterranean Sea. She was on a voyage from Constantinople, Ottoman Empire to Marseille, Bouches-du-Rhône. She was towed in to Messina, Sicily, Italy in a derelict condition.
