= Bignonia (disambiguation) =

Bignonia may refer to:

- Bignonia a genus of flowering plants in the catalpa family, Bignoniaceae
- Bignonia (grape), an Italian wine grape
- 8850 Bignonia, a main-belt asteroid discovered in 1990
- USS Bignonia (1863), a steamer purchased by the Union Navy during the American Civil War
