= List of shipwrecks in the St. Clair-Detroit River System =

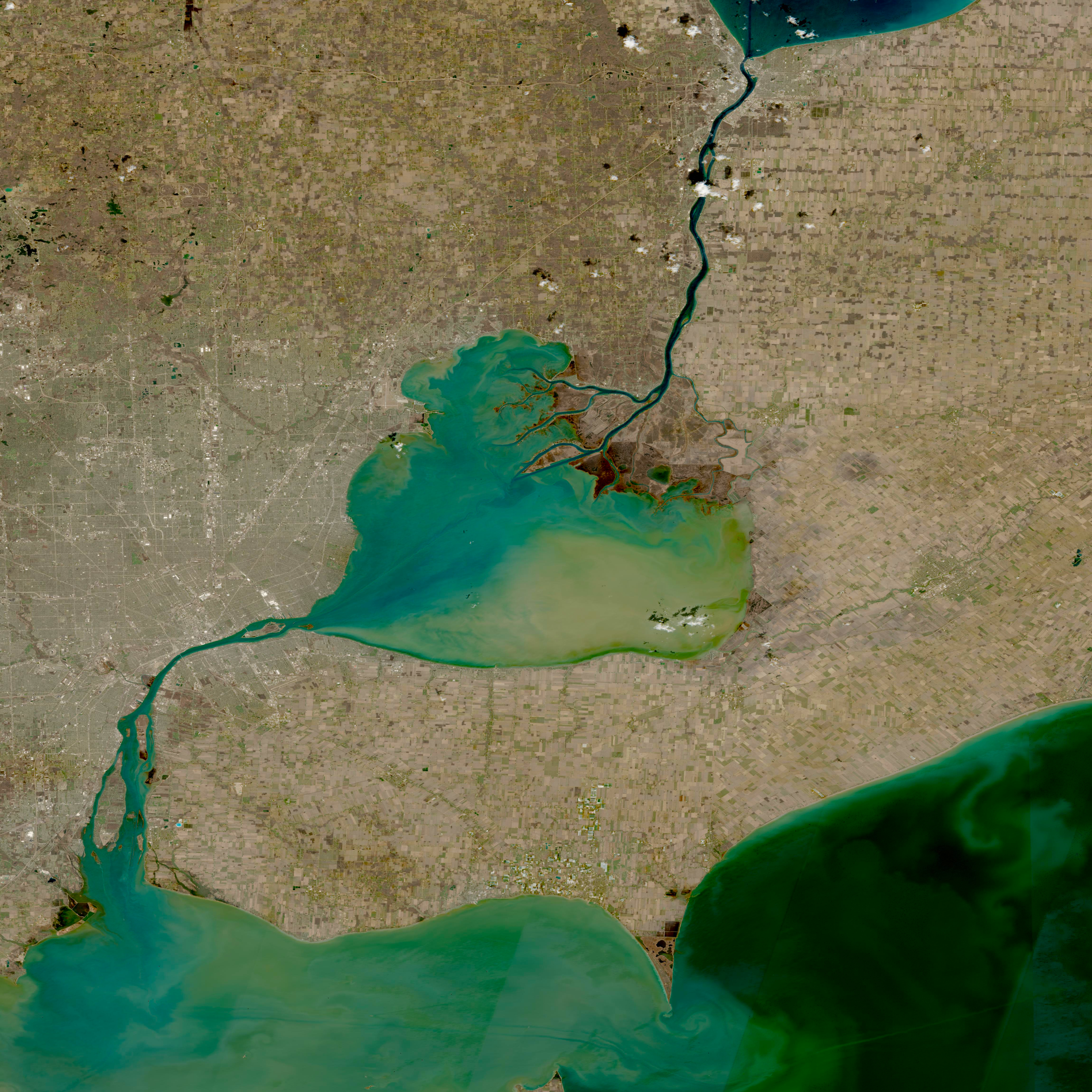
Satellite view of the waterway

The St. Clair–Detroit River System (SCDRS) refers to the waterway connecting Lake Huron and Lake Erie. The system consists of the St. Clair River, Lake St. Clair and the Detroit River, and is bisected by the Canada–United States border. As one of the busiest waterways in the world, numerous shipwrecks have occurred within it.

== List ==
Ship	Ship type	Build date	Sunk date	Flag	Fate	Coordinates	Image	Sources
A. R. Colborne	Wooden steam barge	1882	1922	United States	Abandoned at Port Huron, Michigan, on 28 April 1922.	42.985433°N 82.422650°W		
Badger State	Wooden steam barge	1862	1909	United States	Caught fire while moored at Marine City, Michigan, on 6 December 1909. Cast adrift down the St. Clair River, and sank.	42.606333°N 82.548500°W		
Bothnia	Wooden steam barge	1895	1912	Canada	Sank in a collision with the freighter S. S. Curry near Harsens Island, on 26 June 1912.	42.551772°N 82.644981°W		
D. L. Filer	Wooden schooner-barge	1871	1916	United States	Sank at the southern mouth of the Detroit River during a devastating storm on 19 October 1916, while bound from Buffalo, New York, for Saugatuck, Michigan, with a cargo of coal. Of the 7 crewmen aboard, only the captain survived.	42.057722°N 83.133028°W		
Erin	Wooden steam barge	1881	1906	Canada	Sank in a collision with the freighter John B. Cowle near Courtright, Ontario, on 31 May 1906, while upbound with coal, and towing the schooner Danforth. The wreck stretches across the Canada-United States border.	42.806639°N 82.481972°W		
Fontana	Wooden schooner-barge	1888	1900	United States	Sank in a collision with the schooner-barge Santiago on the morning of 4 August 1900, near Point Edward, Ontario, while bound from Presque Isle, Michigan, for Cleveland, Ohio, with iron ore. She was under tow of the freighter Kaliyuga at the time, while Santiago was in-tow of the freighter Appomattox. Two of the crew were killed. Dynamited by the United States government in October 1900, as a hazard to navigation.	43.003528°N 82.4195°W		
Harlow (Note: Often erroneously referred to as Harlow Loran.)	Wooden steam barge	1891	1927	United States	Originally named Preston. Abandoned near Harsens Island in 1927.	42.574701°N 82.667899°W		
H. Houghten	Wooden steam barge	1889	1926	United States	Burned to the waterline and sank near Algonac, Michigan, on 20 November 1926.	42.619472°N 82.650806°W		
James Beard	Wooden ferry	1873	1927	United States	Abandoned near Port Huron, on 21 June 1927.	42.961167°N 82.424444°W		
John Martin	Wooden schooner-barge	1873	1900	United States	Sank in a collision near Port Huron, with the freighter Yuma on 22 September 1900, while under tow of the freighter Maurice B. Grover, and laden with iron ore.	43.00082°N 82.422462°W		
John N. Glidden	Wooden bulk freighter	1879	1903	United States	Sank near Harsens Island in the St. Clair Flats on 9 October 1903, following a collision with the barge Magna, while laden with iron ore. Anchor and propeller in possession of the Harsens Island and St. Clair Flast Historical Society Museum.	42.581469°N 82.562017°W		
LV-55	Wooden lightship	1891	1932	United States	Abandoned near Port Huron, in 1932.	42.961167°N 82.424444°W		
M. E. Tremble	Wooden schooner	1874	1890	United States	Sank in a collision with the freighter W. L. Wetmore, near Port Huron, on 7 September 1890, while in-tow of the freighter B. W. Blanchard, laden with coal.	42.993707°N 82.426392°W		
Mineral Rock	Wooden barge	1856	1896	United States	Caught fire while docked in Marysville, Michigan, in March 1896. Later abandoned near Port Huron.	42.919806°N 82.460333°W		
Monarch	Wooden tug	1889	1934	United States	Sank near Sarnia, Ontario, on 6 July 1934, while towing the freighter C. F. Bielman. A sudden, erratic swing of C. F. Bielman caused Monarch to capsize.	42.996094°N 82.422533°W		
Nellie Lyon	Wooden dredge	1880	1911	Canada	Burned near Algonac, on 9 April 1911. Previously named H. C. Sprague and later Reliance.	42.630833°N 82.635850°W		
N. Mills	Wooden steam barge	1870	1906	United States	Sank in a collision with the steel freighter Milwaukee near St. Clair, Michigan, on 6 September 1906, while bound from Cleveland, for Algoma Mills, Ontario, with the schooner A. Anderson in tow.	42.795500°N 82.477806°W		
Ontonagon	Wooden steamship	1857	1883	United States	Caught fire while loaded with lumber on 25 September 1883. Run ashore on Stag Island, and allowed to burn.			
Queenston	Steel canaller	1927	1961	Canada	Sunk as a dock at Bois Blanc Island in 1961.	42.093972°N 83.1175°W		
Saltillo	Wooden brigantine	1847	1853	United States	Sank in a collision with the schooner Trade Wind 25 November 1853, near Port Huron, while laden with coal and rails. Oldest known shipwreck in the St. Clair River.	42.980533°N 82.417033°W		
Sidney E. Smith Jr.	Steel bulk freighter	1906	1972	United States	Sank in a collision near the Blue Water Bridge between Port Huron, and Sarnia, with the freighter Parker Evans on 5 June 1972, while bound from Toledo, Ohio, for Lime Island, Michigan, with a cargo of coal. Settled onto her starboard side, blocking part of the St. Clair River, the bow breaking off during 1–2 days after the sinking. Hull salvaged, and repurposed as a dock in Sarnia, in 1973.	42.982472°N 82.414059°W		
Thomas D. Stimson	Wooden steam barge	1881	1903	United States	Beached after catching fire near Algonac, on 30 June 1903, while laden with lumber.	42.6115°N 82.530722°W		
William H. Wolf	Wooden bulk freighter	1887	1921	United States	Burned and sank in the St. Clair River on 20 October 1921, while en route from Port Huron, to a dry dock in Detroit, Michigan, for repairs. Raises and scuttled near Fawn Island in 1925.	42.688556°N 82.497485°W		

== See also ==
- List of shipwrecks on the Great Lakes
- List of Great Lakes shipwrecks on the National Register of Historic Places

== Bibliography ==
- Kohl, Cris (2008). The Great Lakes Diving Guide (2nd ed.). West Chicago: Seawolf Communications. ISBN 978-0-9679-9769-8.
