= SS Appomattox =

Largest wooden steamship on the Great Lakes wrecked in 1905

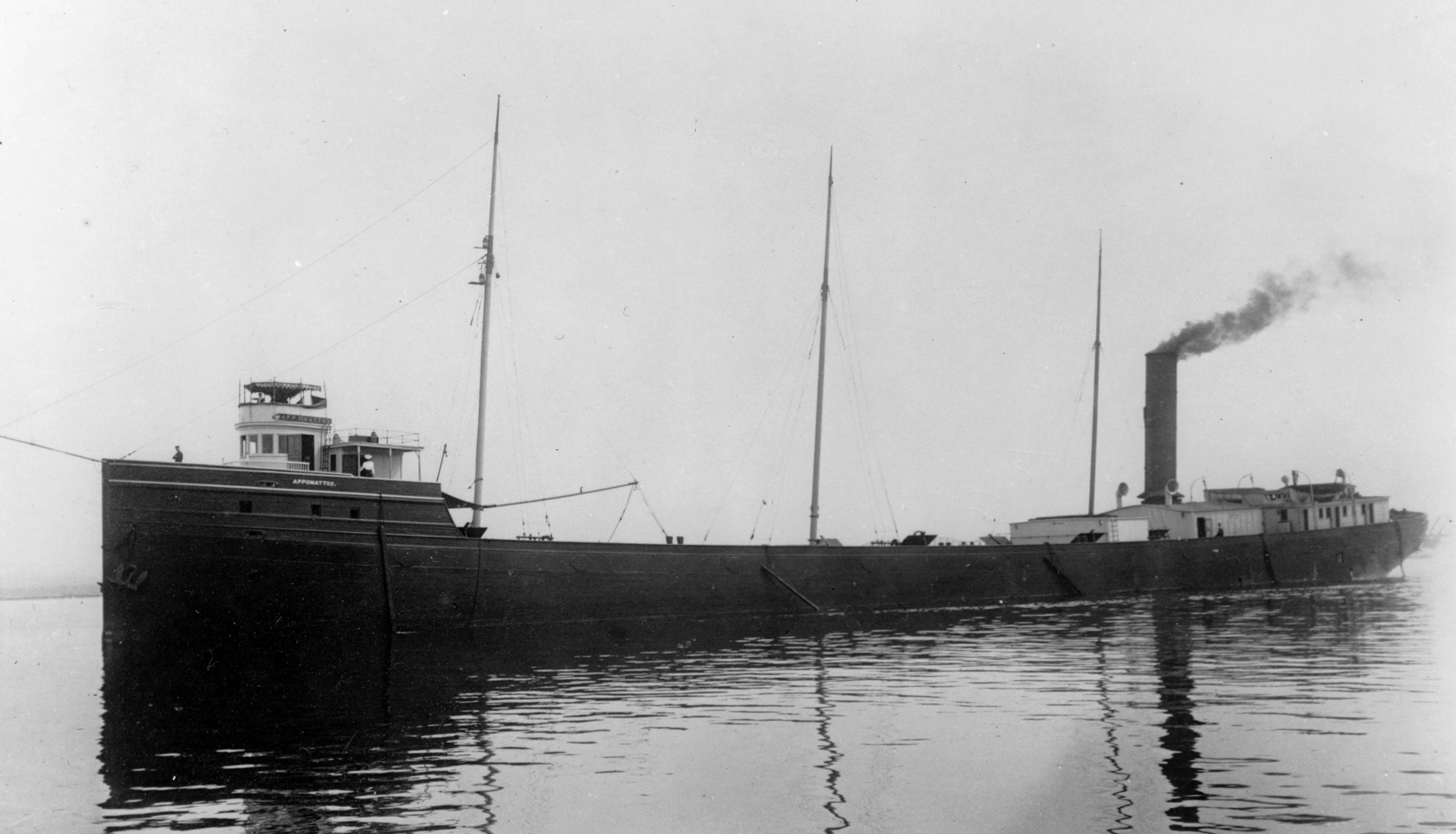
- The Appomattox in the St. Marys River

History

United States
- Name: Appomattox
- Operator: Davidson Steamship Company 1896-1899; Boston Coal Dock & Wharf Company 1899-1905
- Port of registry: United States, Duluth, Minnesota
- Builder: James Davidson
- Yard number: 77
- In service: 1896
- Out of service: November 2, 1905
- Identification: U.S. Registry #116682
- Fate: Ran aground on a reef on Lake Michigan

General characteristics
- Type: Bulk Freighter
- Tonnage: 2,643 GRT; 2,082 NRT
- Length: 330 ft (100 m) LOA; 319.80 ft (97.48 m) LBP
- Beam: 42 ft (13 m)
- Height: 23 ft (7.0 m)
- Installed power: 2 × Scotch marine boilers
- Propulsion: 1.100 horsepower triple expansion steam engine
- Appomattox (shipwreck)
- U.S. National Register of Historic Places
- Location within Wisconsin Location within the United States
- Location: 150 yd (140 m) off Atwater Beach in the village of Shorewood, Wisconsin
- Coordinates: 43°5′37.09″N 87°51′58.35″W
- Area: 2.9 acres (1.2 ha)
- Built by: James Davidson
- NRHP reference No.: 04001547
- Added to NRHP: January 20, 2005

SS Appomattox was a wooden-hulled, American Great Lakes freighter that ran aground on Lake Michigan, off Atwater Beach off the coast of Shorewood, Wisconsin in Milwaukee County, Wisconsin, United States in 1905. On January 20, 2005 the remnants of the Appomattox were listed on the National Register of Historic Places.

== History ==
The Appomattox (Official number 116682) was built in 1896 in West Bay City, Michigan by the shipyard owned by master shipbuilder James Davidson who was known for his innovative wooden hulled ships. (Note: James While most companies started to build ships with steel hulls, Davidson continued building wooden ships and pushed the boundaries of wooden boat technology. Because of this he eventually manufactured some of the largest wooden ships in the world like: the Appomattox, the Frank O'Connor and the Pretoria) It was the largest wooden steam powered bulk carrier ever to sail on the Great Lakes. It was built for the Davidson Steamship Company which was also owned by Captain Davidson; it was also one of the last ships he built. At an overall length of 330 feet (100 m) the Appomattox was one of the largest wooden ships ever built. Its hull was 319.80 feet (97.48 m) between its perpendiculars. Its beam was 42 feet (13 m) wide, and its hull was 23 feet (7.0 m) deep. It had a gross register tonnage of 2643 tons, and a net register tonnage of 2082 tons. It was equipped with a 1,100 horsepower triple expansion steam engine which was built by the Frontier Iron Works Company of Detroit. Its engine was fueled by two Scotch marine boilers that were built by the Wickes Brothers of Saginaw, Michigan. They measured 12.3 feet (3.7 m) by 12.160 feet (3.706 m)

Due to the vessel's length, the Appomattox used metallic cross bracing, a metallic keelson, metallic plates, and multiple metallic arches. Several siphons and pumps were required to keep the Appomattox afloat.

The Appomattox operated mainly on the Great Lakes, carrying iron ore on its eastward voyages, and then returning westward with coal. The ship usually towed the steamer barge Santiago, which had a length of 324 feet (98.8 m), to increase the amount of cargo carried each trip. The Appomattox alone could carry more than 3,000 tons of bulk cargo, and it and the Santiago had a combined capacity approaching 8,000 tons.

On August 3, 1900 the Appomattox was towing the schooner-barge Santiago in the St. Clair River. Meanwhile, the schooner Fontana was under tow of the steamer Kaliyuga. Then as the four ships approached each other, the Santiago veered off course and collided with the Fontana, which sank almost immediately with one fatality.

== Final voyage ==
On the day of November 2, 1905 the coal-laden Appomattox was bound southward with the Santiago which was also full of coal. They were sailing on the west shore of Lake Michigan. The pair came upon a thick bank of fog which severely impaired their visibility. The two vessels came too close to the shoreline and ran aground. Another vessel named Iowa was nearby, and she also ran aground. With the use of wrecking tugs, a Revenue Service cutter and the crew of the United States Life-Saving Service Station were able to free the Santiago and the Iowa in no time at all. Unfortunately the Appomattox had run aground so hard that it sustained severe bottom damage, the crews worked but were unable to refloat the hull.

As the weather deteriorated, and the waves continued to pound the hulk of the Appomattox, the crew of the wrecking tugs and the U.S. Lifesaving Service continued in their effort to salvage her. But the bottom of the Appomattox had cracked in several places, and even though multiple pumps were used, they could not keep the water from entering her hull. The wrecking crews abandoned her on November 15, 1905. In 1907, or 1919, the Reid (or Reed) Wrecking Company of Sarnia removed all of her machinery.

== Wreck ==
The remains of the Appomattox rest in 15 to 20 feet (4.6 to 6.1 m) of water 150 yards (140 m) off Atwater Beach. The remains consist of the Appomattox's intact lower bilge which measures 250 feet (76 m), her port side which measures 260 feet (79 m) in length, her starboard side, the remains of her engine beds are also located within the wreck. The wreck is popular with divers due to its close proximity to shore and shallow depth.
