= Argo (barge) =

Tank barge and shipwreck

Coordinates: 41.639167°N 82.493056°W

History

United States
- Name: Argo
- Owner: Independent Pier Company
- Operator: W.J. Townsend
- Builder: Spedden Shipbuilding Company
- Launched: 1911
- Fate: Sank 1937

General characteristics
- Type: Tank barge
- Tonnage: 421
- Length: 120 ft (37 m)
- Beam: 34 ft (10 m)
- Depth: 12-foot-6-inch (3.81 m)

The Argo is a tank barge that sank in Lake Erie on October 20, 1937. It was carrying nearly 200,000 gallons (4,762 barrels) of crude oil and benzol when it foundered in a storm off Pelee Island. The Argo was not designed for open waters. In 2013 the wreck was assessed to be the Great Lakes shipwreck most likely to create an environmental disaster. The wreck sat at the bottom of the lake for nearly 78 years before it was discovered in 2015. A three-month cleanup effort involving the U.S. Coast Guard, Canadian authorities, and the National Oceanic and Atmospheric Administration extracted nearly 50,000 gallons of contaminated water from the wreck.

== Vessel description ==
The Argo was a steel-hulled tank barge built in Baltimore, Maryland, in 1911 by Spedden Shipbuilding. It was 34 feet (10 m) wide, 120 feet (37 m) long and 12 feet 6 inches (3.81 m) deep. It had eight cargo tanks and, aside from a self-unloading boom, the vessel was a typical example of the era's East Coast barges. It was operated by W.J. Townsend, a businessman from Bayonne, New Jersey, who had a fleet of tugboats and barges.

The Argo was certified by the American Bureau of Shipping and the Bureau of Marine Inspection and Navigation to operate in rivers, sounds, and protected coastal bays surrounding New York City. It was not designed for use in the open waters of the Great Lakes and its operation in Lake Erie was illegal.

== Sinking ==
The Argo originated in New Jersey and was on a return voyage there from the Algoma Steel plant in Sault Ste. Marie, Ontario, where it had loaded its eight cargo tanks with 1,500 tons of cargo. It was the first time the vessel had traversed the Great Lakes. According to the barge's records, it was carrying nearly 200,000 gallons (4,762 barrels) of crude oil and benzol, a buoyant petroleum distillate. When the barge was fully loaded, it only had roughly 2 feet 6 inches (0.76 m) of freeboard, violating load line rules.

Early in October 1937, the Argo was being pulled by the tugboat Syosset. With a heavy northwest storm approaching, the vessels paused near Amherstburg, at the mouth of the Detroit River. Once the weather settled on October 19, they headed out into Lake Erie. Weather conditions deteriorated and the ships were seeking refuge near the eastern end of Pelee Island. Winds of 20–40 miles per hour (32–64 km/h) caused waves to crash onto the Argo's decks and it began to sink. The two crewmembers onboard made their way to the starboard stern, the only part of the barge above water. They were rescued by the Syosset crew, who circled back and threw lines to the pair. As the Argo sank into the water, it turned onto one side, eventually righting itself before sinking to the bottom.

An October 22, 1937 article in The Evening News of Sault Ste. Marie, Michigan reported the incident. Captain Henry G. Fisher of the United States Coast Guard's Cleveland district relayed that the crew of the USCGC cutter Tahoma thought they had located the Argo in about 40 feet of water, four miles east of the shoals of Kelleys Island.

Following the incident, a report by the Board of Inquiry of the United States Department of Commerce made a recommendation to fine W.J. Townsend, the Argo's owner, but no records have been found to indicate that a fine was ever imposed. The barge and its contents were abandoned to the lake's bottom, slowly sinking into the sediments of the lake bed.

== Assessment of hazards ==
Research conducted by the National Oceanic and Atmospheric Administration (NOAA) in 2013 as part of its Remediation of Underwater Legacy Environmental Threats program identified the wreck of the Argo as a potential source of pollution. It was thought that the barge was carrying about 100,000 gallons of heavy crude oil and that much of the benzol would have volatilized at the time of the wreck. The Argo was placed on a list of hazardous shipwrecks and a 2013 NOAA report assessed it as being the Great Lakes shipwreck most likely to create an environmental disaster. The assessment led to a joint tabletop exercise simulating a hypothetical spill from the Argo, conducted by Canadian officials and the U.S. Coast Guard in 2014.

== Discovery ==
On August 28, 2015, the sunken wreck was detected by Tom Kowalczk, a member of the Cleveland Underwater Explorers (CLUE). Equipped with a side-scan sonar system, Kowalczk had been looking for another wreck, that of the wooden schooner Lexington, that sank in 1846 with a cargo of 110 barrels of whiskey and a safe rumored to contain gold.

The wreck of the Argo was discovered inside the U.S. line, eight miles east of Kelley's Island Shoal, and about five or six miles south of the location historically given for the barge, in Canadian waters, about 13 miles north of Lakeside in western Lake Erie.

CLUE reported their discovery to the National Museum of the Great Lakes, which had been a sponsor of their shipwreck efforts. They then informed the Coast Guard of their findings.

== Cleanup ==
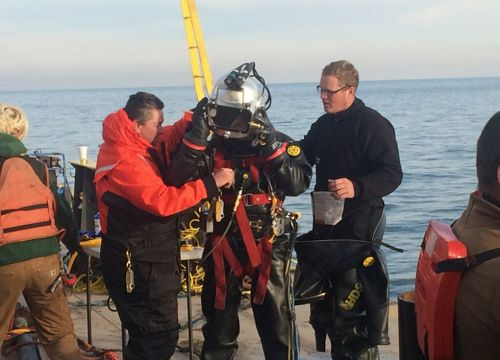
Coworkers inspect a diver in a positive pressure dive suit prior to conducting dive operations as a response to the shipwreck on November 24, 2015.

The three-month cleanup effort involved the U.S. Coast Guard, Canadian authorities, NOAA, and the contractor T&T Salvage.

The initial dive operations were complicated by the unknown thickness of the hull and a lack of the barge's architectural plans. Officials knew that the vessel had been carrying nearly 200,000 gallons of heavy crude oil and benzol. It was assumed that the cargo was composed of half of each substance.

The wreck was covered in "hundreds of thousands, if not millions" of zebra mussels. and their presence made it difficult to determine whether or not the hull was cracked.

A dive team from the Cleveland Underwater Explorers descended on October 23, 2015, and observed an unknown substance leaking from the hull. It was highly concentrated, eating away at the diver's masks and dive suits. The leak of a petroleum-based solvent was confirmed the following day by the Coast Guard. The barge's eight cargo tanks were found to be intact, with the exception of the leak, which originated from a small rivet hole. An analysis of the leaking substance indicated that it consisted predominantly of benzene with small amounts of a light petroleum product.

Efforts to recover the contents of the cargo tanks continued until December 2015. A hot tapping process proceeded after crews scraped off the zebra mussels. The removal of oil and other chemicals to another vessel was accomplished through lightering operations. The crews used a pumping system that was designed to avoid collapsing the ship while the extraction took place, but only extracted 50,000 gallons of contaminated water.

== See also ==
- List of shipwrecks in the Great Lakes
