= South Sandy Pond =

- Location within New York South Sandy Pond (the United States)
- Location: Oswego County, New York, United States
- Coordinates: 43°37′22″N 76°11′11″W
- Type: Lake
- Primary outflows: North Sandy Pond
- Basin countries: United States
- Surface area: 313 acres (1.27 km^{2})
- Average depth: 10 feet (3.0 m)
- Max. depth: 25 feet (7.6 m)
- Shore length^{1}: 1.4 miles (2.3 km)
- Surface elevation: 243 feet (74 m)
- Settlements: Sandy Creek, New York
- ^{1} Shore length is not a well-defined measure.

South Sandy Pond, also known as South Pond, is a lake located west of Sandy Creek, New York. Fish species present in the lake are yellow perch, bluegill, northern pike, steelhead, smallmouth bass, silver bass, rock bass, largemouth bass, walleye, and black bullhead. There is access via channel from North Sandy Pond.
