= Balize (tug) =

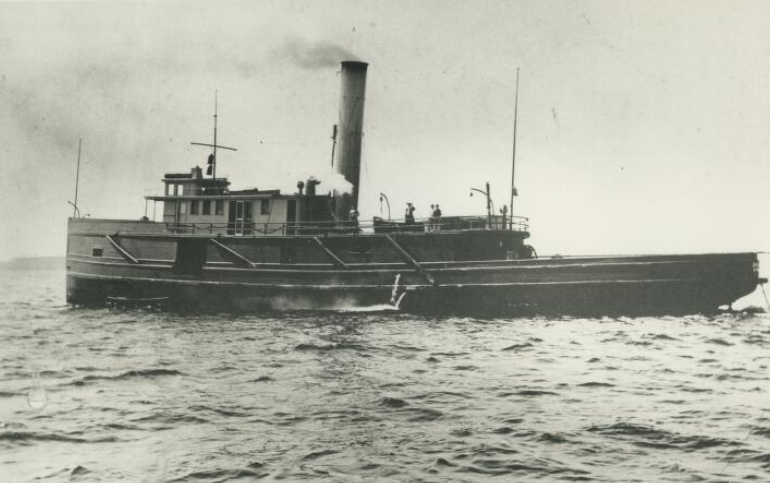
- The Balize underway

History

United States
- Name: Mary Grandy 1863-1865; Bignonia 1865-1865 (U.S. Navy); Balize 1865-1915
- Operator: H.J. Winslow
- Port of registry: United States, Cleveland, Ohio
- Builder: Ira Lafrinier of Cleveland, Ohio
- Yard number: 110
- Identification: U.S. Registry #2714
- Fate: Scrapped in 1915, in Midland, Ontario

General characteristics
- Class & type: Tugboat
- Tonnage: 321.10 gross tons
- Length: 131.50 ft (40.08 m)
- Beam: 21.58 ft (6.58 m)
- Height: 12 ft (3.7 m)
- Installed power: 1x Scotch marine boiler
- Propulsion: Steeple engine

History

United States
- Name: USS Bignonia
- Ordered: as Mary Grandy
- Laid down: date unknown
- Launched: 1863 at Cleveland, Ohio
- Acquired: August 2, 1864
- Commissioned: September 14, 1864
- Decommissioned: July 12, 1865
- Fate: Sold, July 12, 1865

General characteristics
- Type: Tugboat
- Displacement: 321 long tons (326 t)
- Length: 131 ft (40 m)
- Beam: 22 ft (6.7 m)
- Draft: 10 ft 8 in (3.25 m)
- Propulsion: Steam engine; screw-propelled
- Speed: 10 kn (12 mph; 19 km/h)
- Complement: 50
- Armament: 1 × 30-pounder rifle; 2 × 12-pounder smoothbore guns

The Balize was a wooden hulled tugboat that operated on the Great Lakes in the United States and Canada. She was powered by a single cylinder steam powered Steeple engine and fueled by one coal-fired Scotch marine boiler. She had a length of 131.50 feet, a beam of 21.58 feet and height of 12 feet.

== History ==
The Balize was built in 1863 Cleveland, Ohio by Ira Lafrinier as the Mary Grandy. On August 2, 1864 she was purchased by the United States Navy, and was renamed USS Bignonia. She was commissioned on September 14, 1864. She was used by the Union Navy as a tugboat in support of the Union Navy blockade of Confederate waterways. Until April 1865, the Bignonia served with the North Atlantic Blockading Squadron as a tug. She was reassigned to the West Gulf Blockading Squadron in April 1865.

On 12 July 1865 she was sold to L. Burrows of Stonington and renamed Balize. On September 22, 1871, the Balize grounded off Stony Point, she was later removed by the tug Vulcan. She was rebuilt with two 460-horsepower compound engines in Buffalo, New York. On June 11, 1881, the Balize was rebuilt in Detroit to haul logs across Lake Huron. On April 28, 1883, she was sold to the Detroit Tug & Transit Company of Detroit. In September 1883 the Balize had a collision with the steamer A.W. Coulton near Belle Isle Park on the Detroit River. She caught fire in Detroit in December that same year.

On November 7, 1900, the Balize and another tug the Wales freed the wooden freighter SS Kaliyuga after she ran aground Detroit River near Amherstburg, Ontario. The tugs were going to take the Kaliyuga to Erie, Pennsylvania, unfortunately they couldn't continue the trip because of a storm and problems with the Balize's engine. The Kaliyuga made it to Erie, Pennsylvania, when the Balize was replaced by the tug Harvey D. Goulder. In 1902 she was purchased by Victoria Harbour Lumber Company of Virginia.

== Disposition ==
In November of 1915 the Balize was taken to Midland, Ontario, where she was dismantled. Her hull lies on the north side of Midland Bay.
