= North Sandy Pond =

Lake in New York, United States

- Location within New York North Sandy Pond (the United States)
- Location: Oswego County, Jefferson County, New York, United States
- Coordinates: 43°39′22″N 76°10′55″W
- Primary inflows: South Sandy Pond, Skinner Creek, Lindsey Creek, Blind Creek, Little Sandy Creek
- Primary outflows: Lake Ontario
- Basin countries: United States
- Surface area: 2,338 acres (9.46 km^{2})
- Average depth: 5 feet (1.5 m)
- Max. depth: 13 feet (4.0 m)
- Shore length^{1}: 2.8 miles (4.5 km)
- Surface elevation: 243 feet (74 m)
- Islands: 1 Carl Island
- Settlements: Sandy Creek, New York
- ^{1} Shore length is not a well-defined measure.

North Sandy Pond, also known as North Pond, is a lake located west of Sandy Creek, New York. Fish species present in the lake are yellow perch, bluegill, northern pike, steelhead, smallmouth bass, silver bass, rock bass, largemouth bass, walleye, and black bullhead. There are fee launches at Skinner Creek and Lindsey Creek off County Route 3 on the east shore.
