= St. Peter (shipwreck) =

Great Lakes schooner shipwreck in Lake Ontario

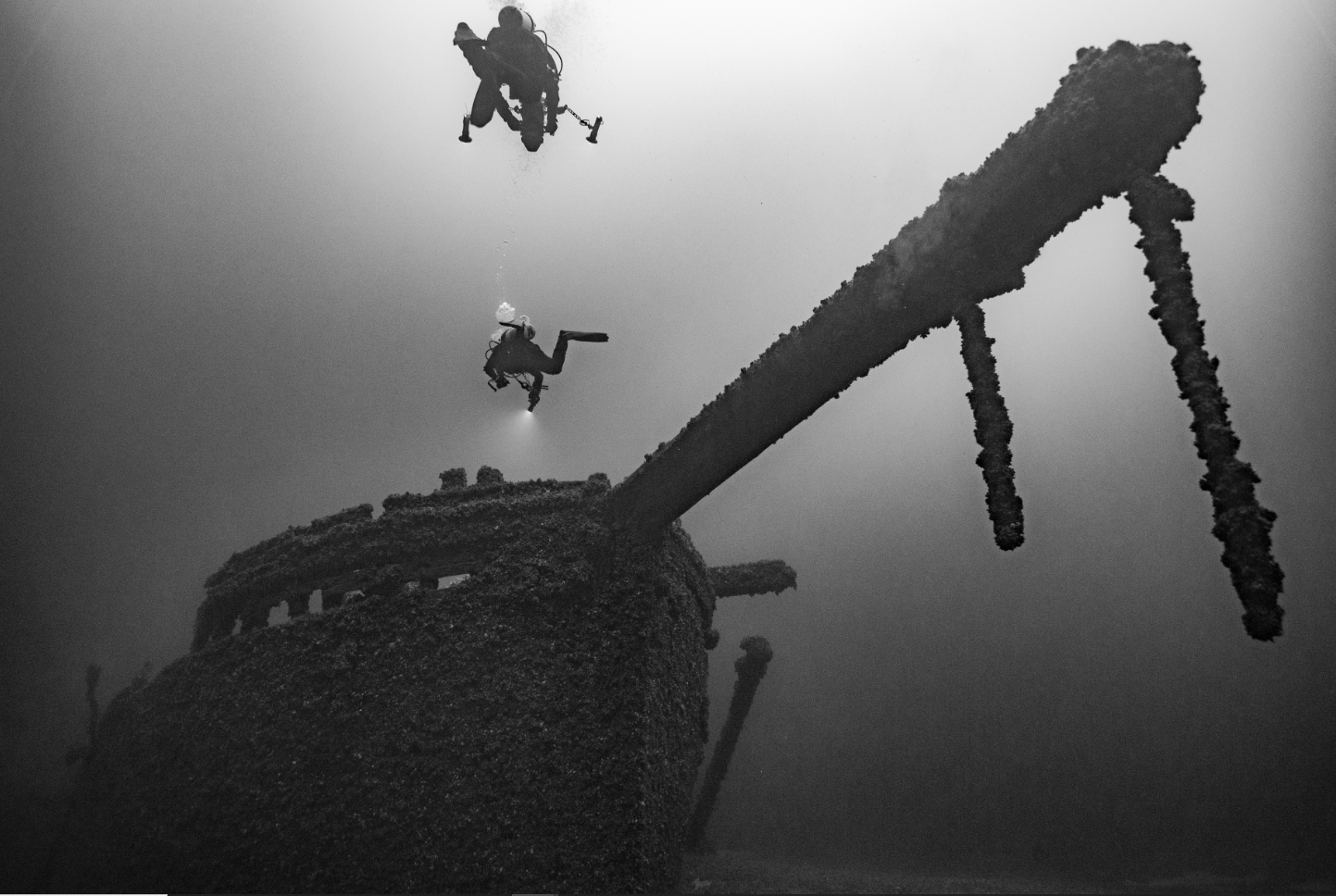
- Divers around the wreckage of St. Peter

History

United States
- Name: St. Peter
- Completed: 1873
- Fate: Sank October 27, 1898

General characteristics
- Tonnage: 290 GRT
- Length: 135.7 ft (41.4 m)
- Beam: 26 ft (7.9 m)
- Depth of hold: 12.1 ft (3.7 m)
- Propulsion: Sails
- Sail plan: Three-masted schooner rig

- St. Peter (Shipwreck)
- U.S. National Register of Historic Places
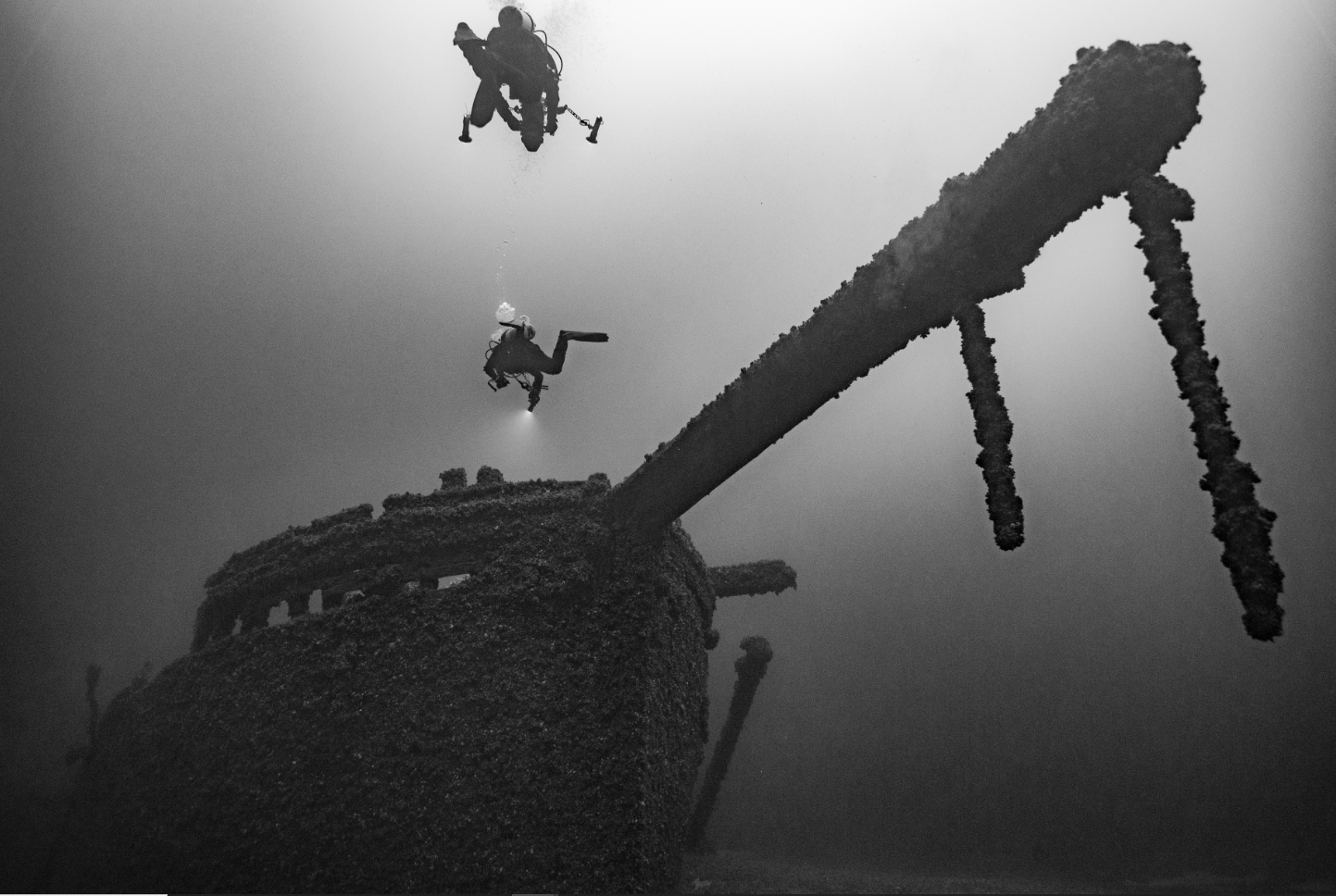
- Divers investigate the wreck of St. Peter.

- Location within New York Location within the United States
- Location: Address Restricted, Pultneyville, New York
- Coordinates: 43°18′42″N 77°7′52″W
- Area: 9.1 acres (3.7 ha)
- Built: 1873
- Architect: Skidmore & Abir; Edwards, Dave
- Architectural style: Great Lakes schooner
- NRHP reference No.: 04000226
- Added to NRHP: March 22, 2004

St. Peter is a historic Great Lakes schooner that sank in 1898 in Lake Ontario near Pultneyville in Wayne County, New York.

== Construction and characteristics ==
St. Peter was a three-masted schooner built in 1873. She measured 135.7 feet (41.4 m) in length and 26 feet (7.9 m) in beam, and her depth of hold was 12.1 feet (3.7 m).

== Sinking ==
Late on the afternoon of October 26, 1898, St. Peter was sailing in southeastern Lake Ontario off the coast of New York westbound for Toledo, Ohio, with a cargo of 607 short tons (542 long tons; 551 tonnes) of "chestnut coal" when she encountered a blizzard with gale-force winds. Facing 20-foot (6.1 m) seas and 70-mile-per-hour (61 kn; 113 km/h) winds, her captain turned eastward to run with the wind.

Early on the morning of October 27, 1898, after a 12-hour overnight battle in darkness against the storm, St. Peter rolled on her side and sank off Bear Creek on the coast of New York, just west of Sodus Bay and 16 miles (14 nmi; 26 km) east of the Charlotte Life Saving Station in Charlotte, New York, just as a United States Life-Saving Service rescue boat approached her. The Life-Saving Service surfmen rescued her captain, who they found unconscious and clinging to a spar. The captain's wife and the other four members of St. Peter′s crew perished.

== Wreck ==
St. Peter′s wreck was discovered in 1971. It sits upright on the bottom of Lake Ontario in 117 feet (36 m) of water northeast of Pultneyville, New York. Its deck and lower hull are intact.

The wreck was listed on the National Register of Historic Places on March 22, 2004. It was included within the boundaries of the Lake Ontario National Marine Sanctuary when the sanctuary was created on September 6, 2024. It is one of the most accessible shipwrecks for recreational divers in the sanctuary. The National Oceanic and Atmospheric Administration has captured photographs of the wreck which it has used to create a three-dimensional photogrammetric model of it.

== Gallery ==
National Oceanic and Atmospheric Administration (NOAA) photos of the wreck of St. Peter:

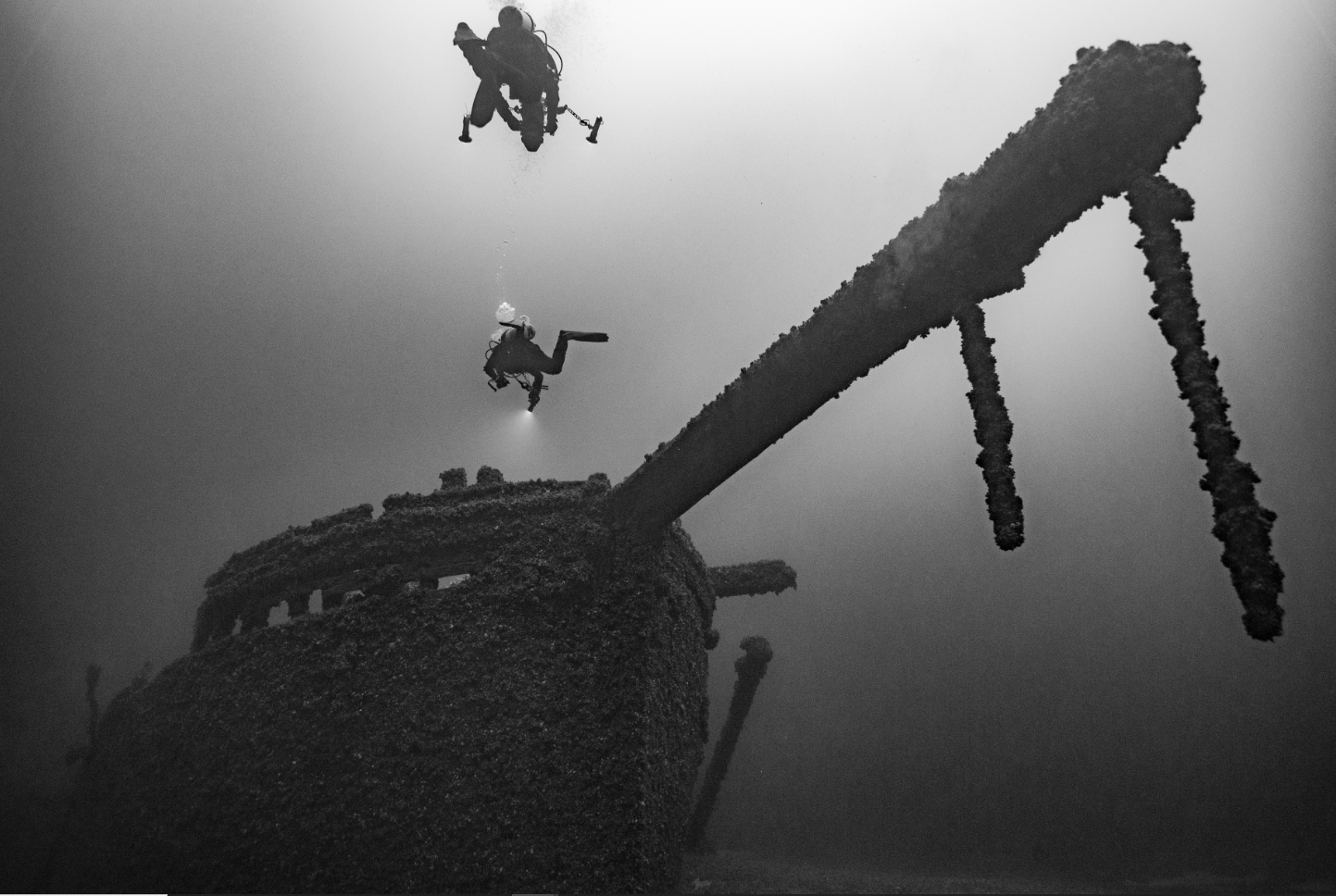

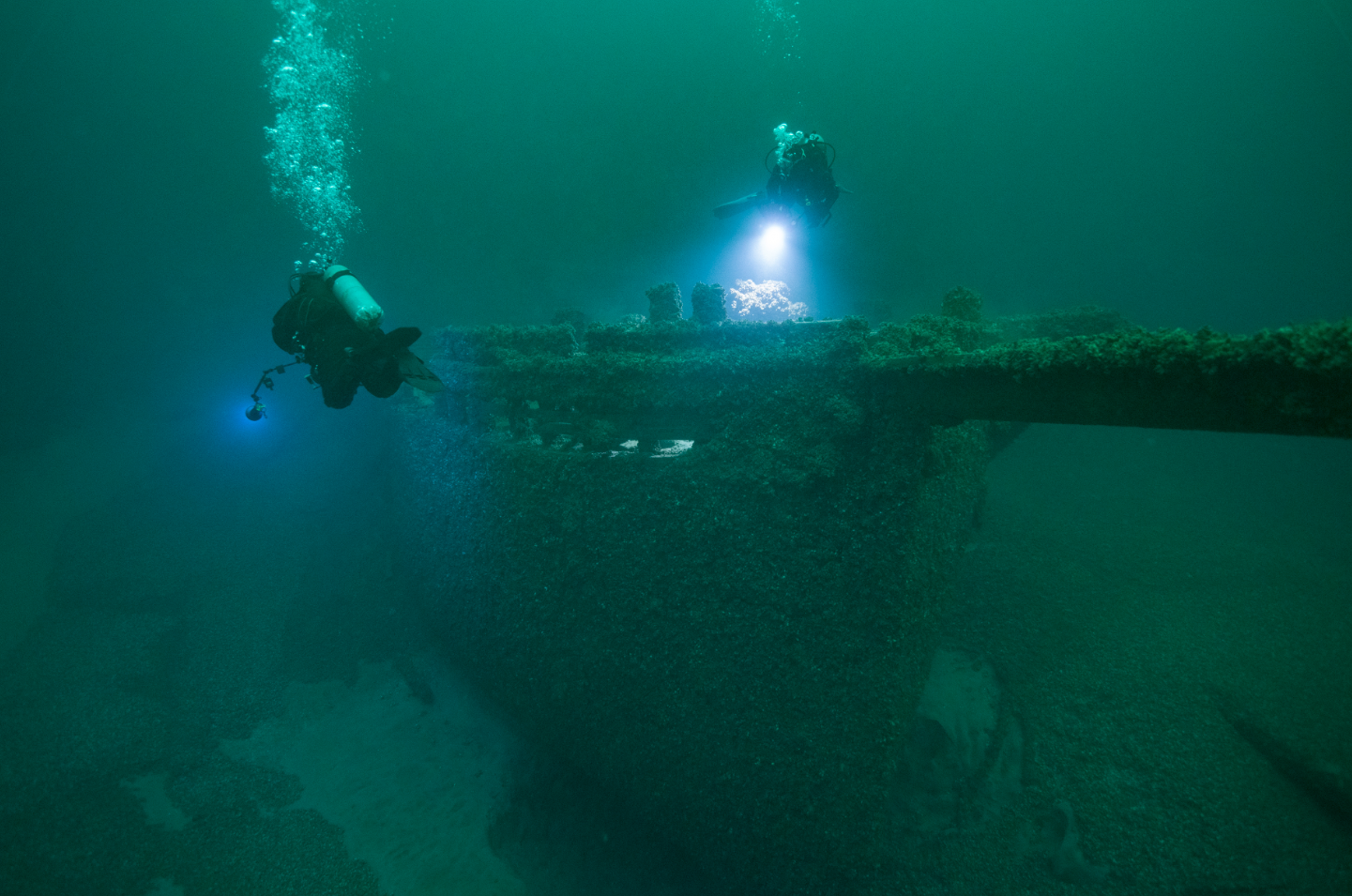

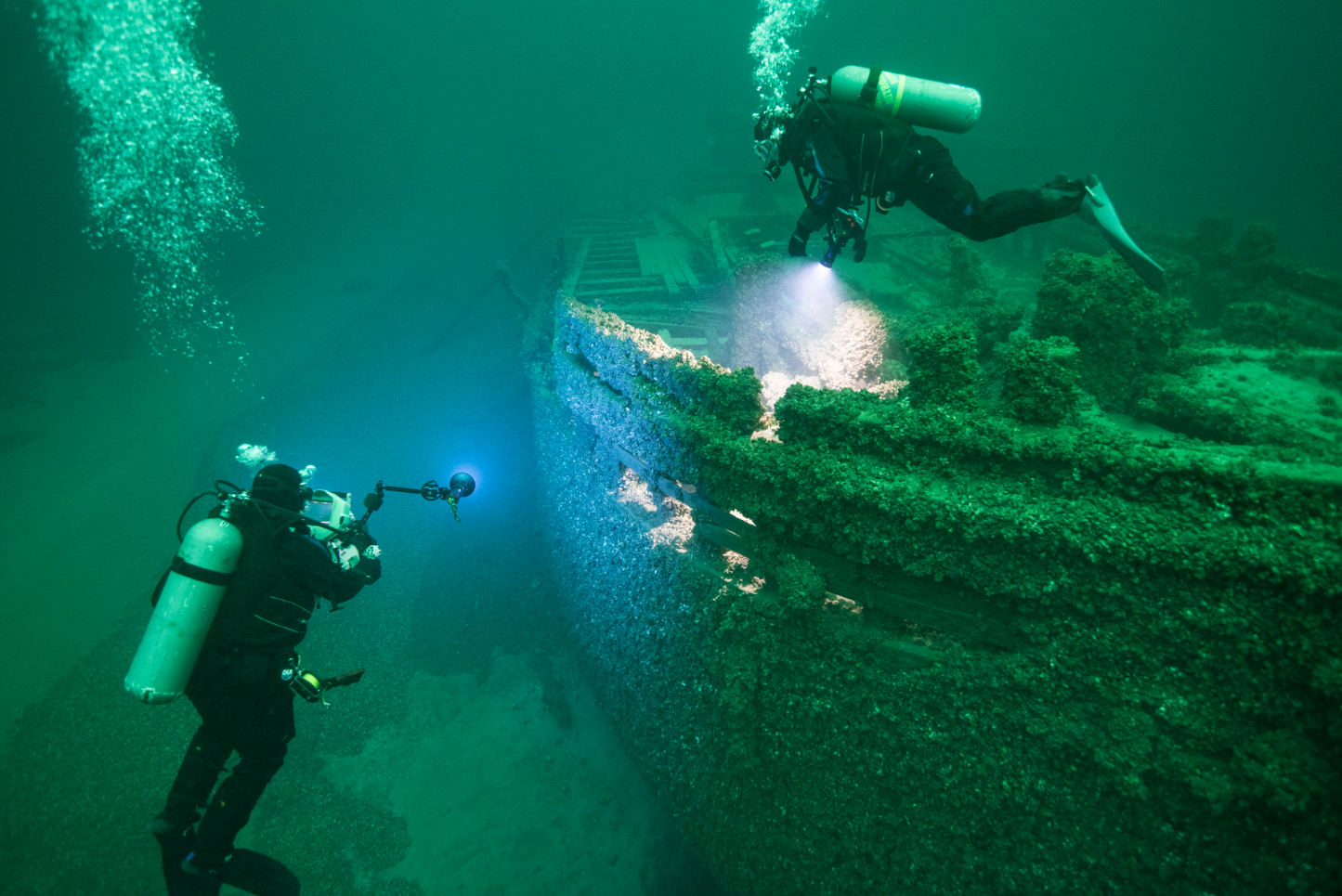

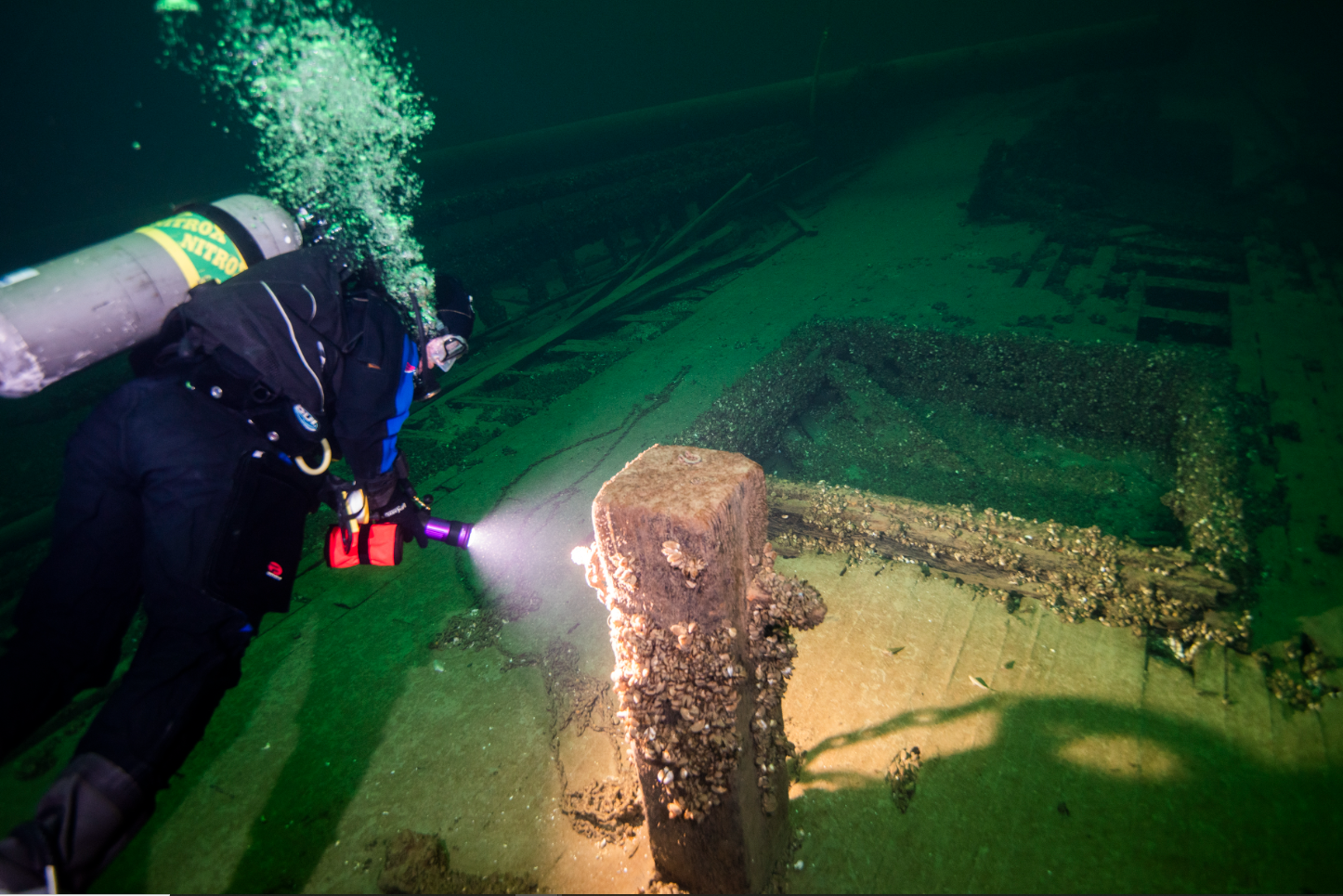

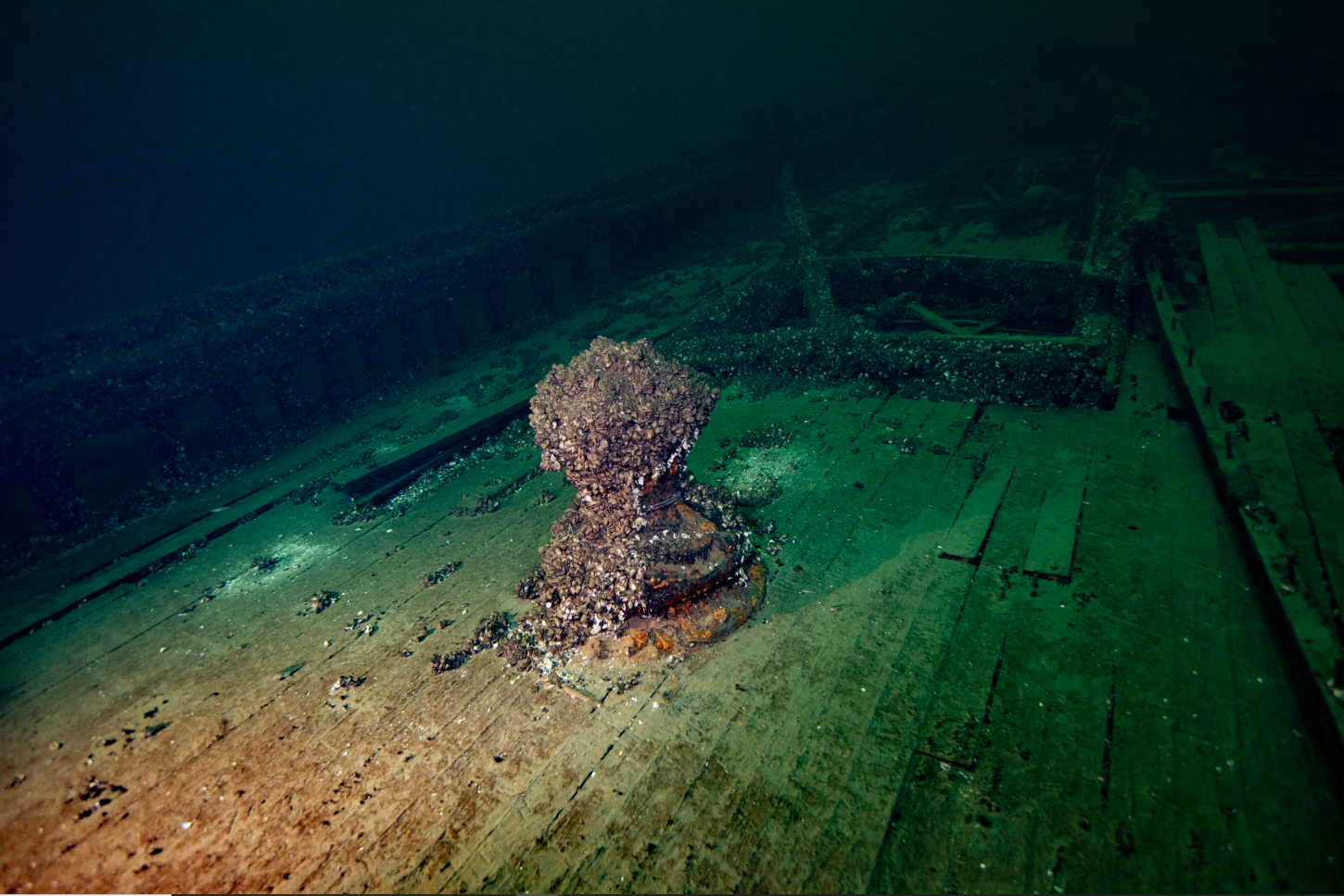

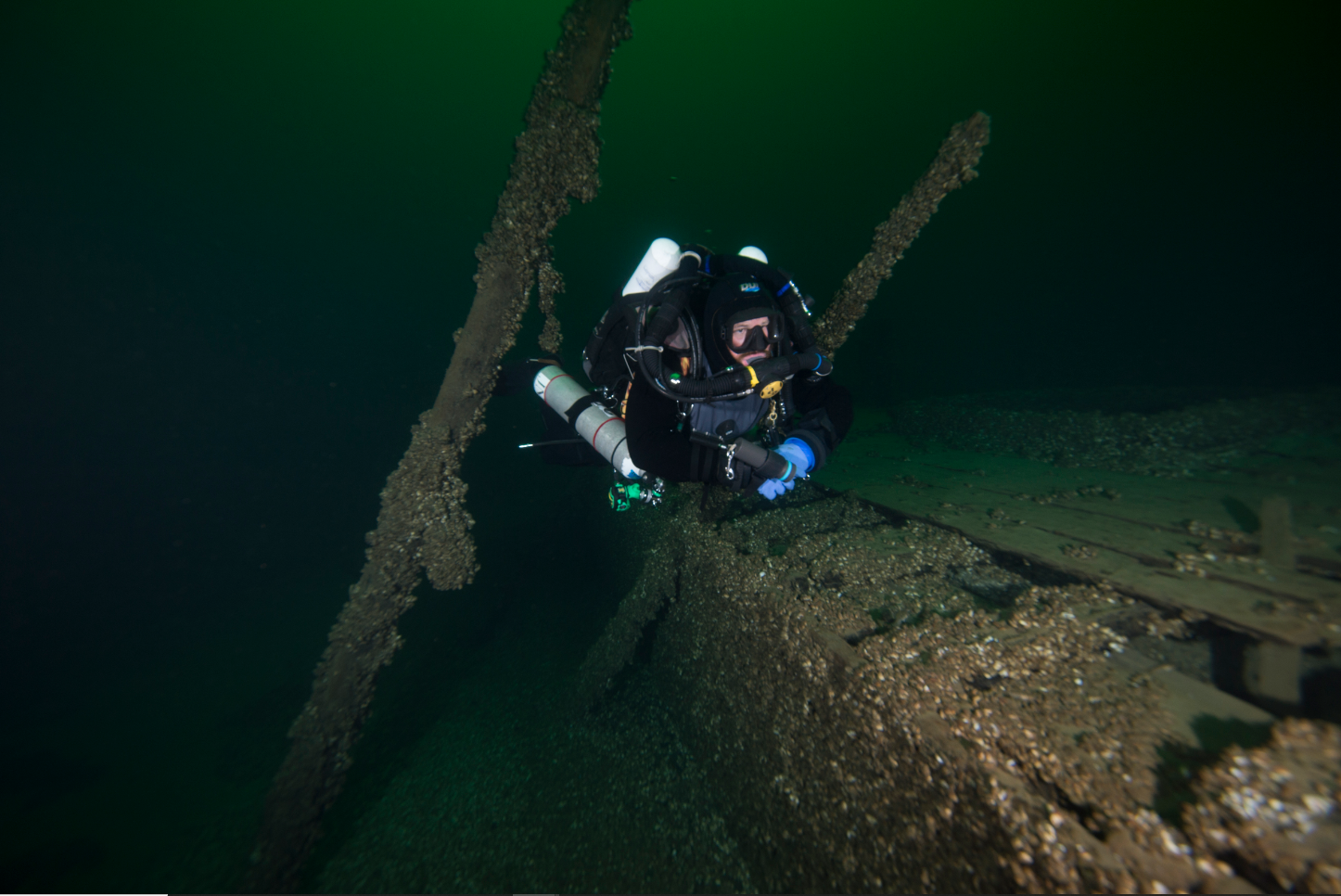

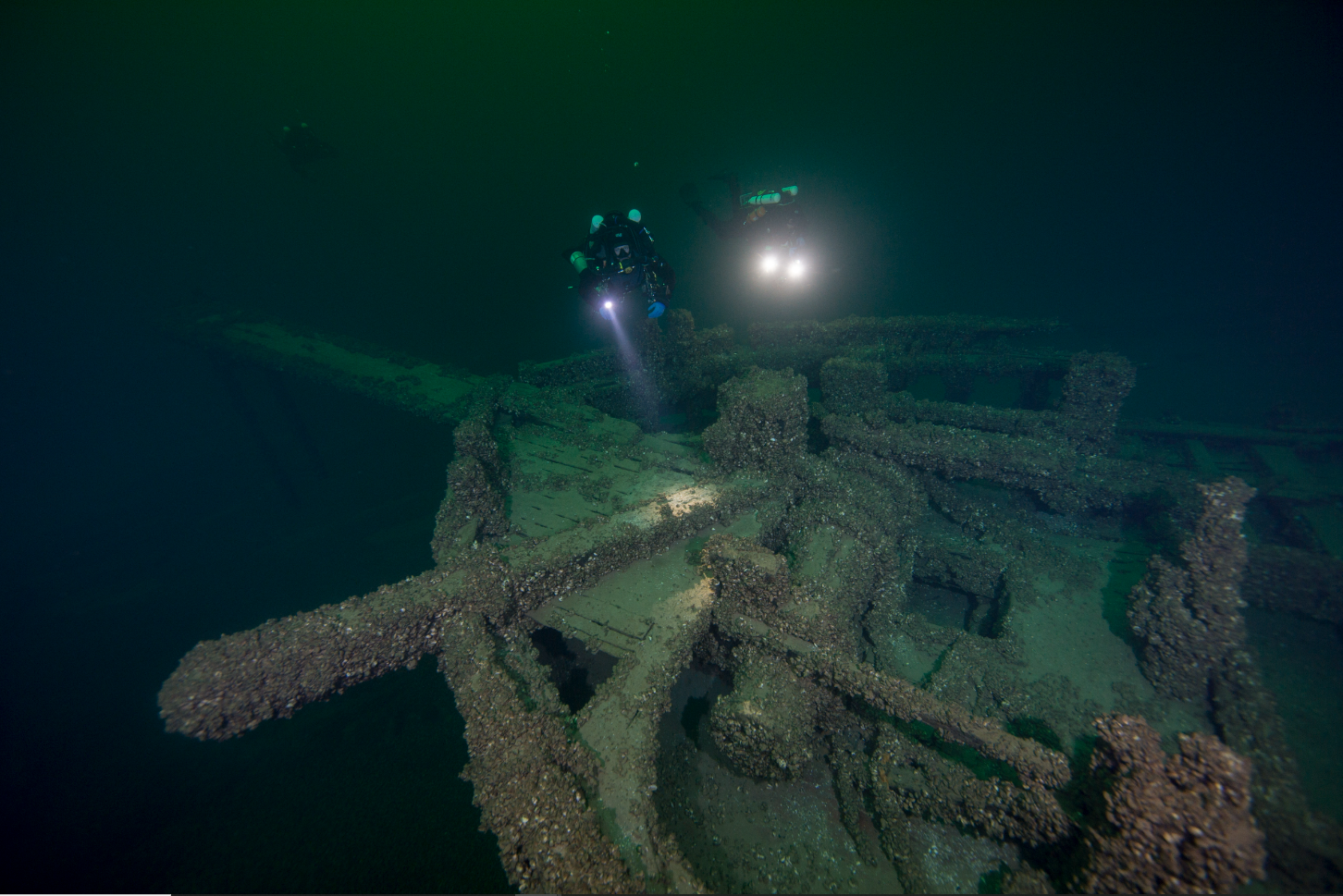
