= SS Kaliyuga =

Great Lakes steamship

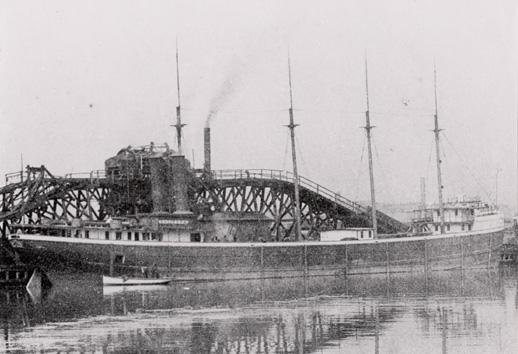
- The Kaliyuga at an ore dock

History

United States
- Name: SS Kaliyuga
- Owner: St. Clair Steamship Co.
- Operator: Cleveland Cliffs Iron Co.
- Builder: Simon Langell of St. Clair, Michigan
- Completed: 1887
- Fate: Lost in a storm on October 19/20, 1905, with 16 crew members (1 absentee)

General characteristics
- Type: Lake freighter
- Tonnage: 1941 gross tons
- Length: 270 ft (82 m)
- Beam: 40 ft (12 m)
- Depth: 21 ft (6.4 m)
- Installed power: Coal fired steam engine
- Crew: 17

The SS Kaliyuga was a steamship that sank with the loss of 16 lives on Lake Huron on the night of October 19/20, 1905. The wreck of the Kaliyuga has never been found, and the cause of her sinking remains a mystery.

== History ==
Built in St. Clair, Michigan in 1887, the SS Kaliyuga was a wooden steamship, built primarily to haul iron ore. She had a length of 269 ft, a width of 40 ft, and measured 1941 gross register tons. The ship was named for the Kali Yuga in Hinduism, one translation of the term being "age of darkness".

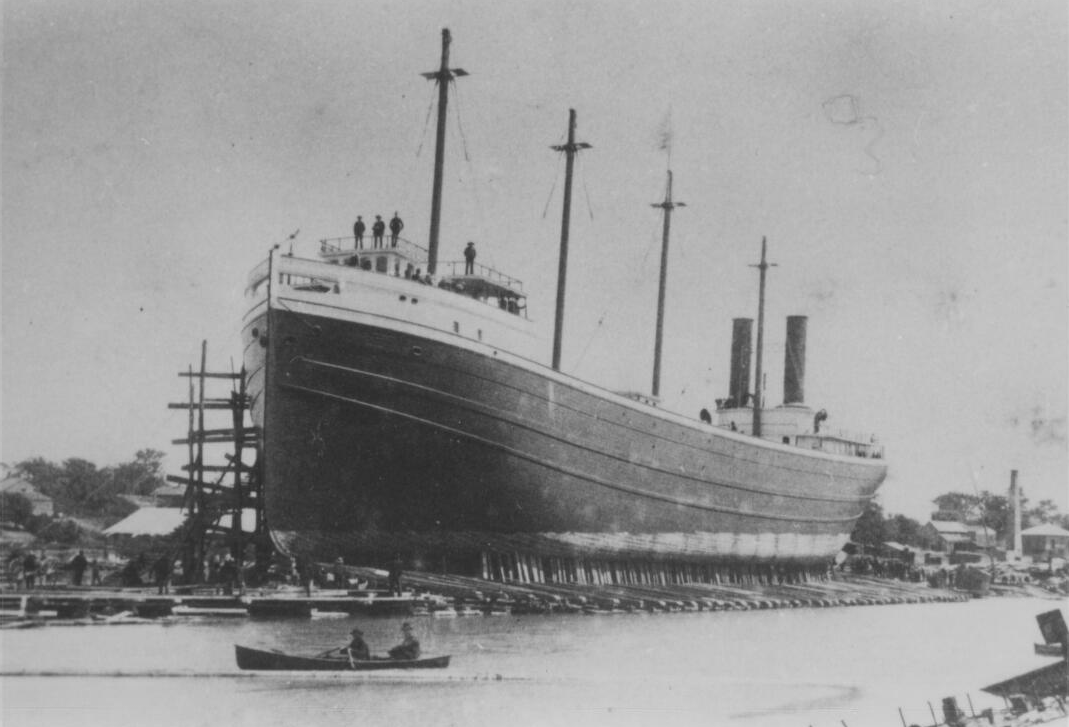
Construction of the Kaliyuga

On 5 August 1895 she stranded on the east end of Bois Blanc Island, receiving $3,000 in damage. On August 4, 1900, the Kaliyuga was towing the barge Fontana into the St. Clair River from Lake Huron when, next to the Fort Gratiot Light, the Fontana was struck by the barge Santiago, passing in the other direction under tow by the steamer SS Appomattox. The Fontana sank within minutes, killing one of the crew.

On November 4, 1900, the Kaliyuga ran aground in the Detroit River near Amherstburg, Ontario. She was pulled off on November 7 by the tugboats Wales and Balize, which started to tow the ship to Erie, Pennsylvania, but on November 8 she was forced to anchor in Lake Erie 30 miles north of Cleveland because of a storm and engine problems on the Balize. With additional help from the tug Harvey D. Goulder she arrived in Erie on November 10.

== Sinking ==
In the early afternoon of October 18, 1905, the Kaliyuga departed Marquette, Michigan with a cargo of iron ore, bound for Erie, Pennsylvania. She passed through the locks at Sault Ste. Marie early on the morning of October 19, passing from Lake Superior to Lake Huron. A strong gale began blowing out of the northeast later that morning, catching the Kaliyuga on the open lake. With no safe anchorage nearby, the Kaliyuga was forced to ride out the storm by heading east towards the Bruce Peninsula, away from the lee shore.

Steaming eastwards while being pushed southwards by the strong wind, the Kaliyuga made slow progress. At 4:00 pm she was sighted by the steamer Frontenac, seven miles east of Presque Isle, Michigan. She was spotted for the second and last time by Captain John Duddleson of the steamer L. C. Waldo around sunset, between Middle Island and Thunder Bay Island. At around 2:00 am on the morning of October 20, the gale swung direction from northeast to northwest.

Wreckage in the form of the Kaliyuga's pilothouse was found on October 26 in Georgian Bay near Cove Island by the steamer Lillie Smith. The body of oiler Charles Beaugrand was found on October 29 3 miles south of Kincardine, Ontario. He was identified by a notebook with his name on it. On the second page was a good-bye note:

"Dear Father: Good-bye. I have a bank book in the Cleveland Society of Savings. Good-bye mother, dear sister and brother. xxxx A kiss for all."

On November 2 three more bodies were recovered. The body of what was initially thought to be a fireman was found in the harbour of Port Elgin, Ontario, but was later identified as deckhand John Rush. The bodies of deckhand John Yotter and steward Laflamme were found near Southampton, Ontario. Both Beaugrand and Rush were reported found wearing Kaliyuga life preservers.

Based on the locations of the bodies and the wreckage, there are two theories as to the fate of the Kaliyuga.

First theory: the Kaliyuga sank in the middle of Lake Huron on the evening of October 19, either overcome by high waves or caught when the wind shifted direction. The storm blew the bodies to the southeast, while a current carried the wreckage into Georgian Bay.

Second theory: the Kaliyuga reached the eastern shore of Lake Huron, losing men overboard en route. As she arrived the wind shifted, and the Kaliyuga was then at risk of being driven ashore. Therefore, she tried to round the Bruce Peninsula to reach shelter in Georgian Bay, but hit a shoal in either Main or Macgregor Channel on the morning of October 20.

The Kaliyuga had a crew of 17, but second mate Charles Murphy had missed the boat at Erie, Pennsylvania a few days before the Kaliyuga's final trip. It has been noted that for a ship of this size, the Kaliyuga was significantly undermanned. A crew of 24 or 26 was normal, with 4-6 firemen, 4-6 coal passers, as well as a third mate and a third engineer.
