= Northumberland (1864 ship) =

History

United Kingdom
- Name: Northumberland
- Owner: Davies & Son
- Launched: 1864
- Fate: Sank 1868

General characteristics
- Class & type: Barque

Northumberland was a barque that sunk in 1868 in King George Sound near Albany in the Great Southern region of Western Australia.

The ship struck a reef near Bald Head on 14 June 1868 while en route from Newcastle to Albany and it was caught it a strong gale.

The commander of the vessel was Captain Humphreys who had sailed from Port of Tyne on 2 March 1868 with 23 crew aboard. It was transporting coal and had a mass of 1168 tons. After striking the reef the crew abandoned ship on 19 June and manned the boats sailing in the lee of the Northumberland then sailing to Breaksea Island on 20 June.

== See also ==
- List of shipwrecks of Australia § Western Australia
