= Cortland (1867 ship) =

1867 barque sunk in Lake Erie

- The only known contemporary photograph of the Cortland

History
- Name: Cortland
- Builder: Albert G. Huntley
- Cost: $50,000
- Launched: 1867
- Out of service: June 1868
- Fate: Collided with the Morning Star

General characteristics
- Type: Barque
- Tonnage: 676
- Length: 243 ft (74 m)

Cortland was a wooden bark built by Albert G. Huntley in 1867. In 1868, she sank on Lake Erie off Lorain, Ohio after colliding with the Morning Star, which also sank.

== Background ==
The Cortland built in 1867 by Albert G. Huntley in Sheboygan, Wisconsin at a cost of $50,000. At the time of her launch, she was 174 feet long, 34 feet wide, and over 13 feet tall, making her the largest sailing vessel built in Sheboygan. She was a wooden bark with three masts.

In June 1868, the Cortland departed Escanaba, Michigan bound for Cleveland, Ohio, carrying a single passenger, 11 crew members, and 891 tons of iron ore. She was under the command of captain James W. Louden.

== Sinking ==
On June 21, 1868, crew member Andrew Brown saw the lights of the steamship, Morning Star. He alerted the ships first mate, who rang the fog bell, but the crew of the Morning Star did not react soon enough to prevent a collision.

The Morning Star sank in only 15 minutes, while the Cortland drifted away and took 90 minutes to sink. 2 people on the Cortland and at least 30 people on the Morning Star died. The survivors of both ships were rescued by the L. H. Colton, and the R.N. Rice, a sister ship of the Morning Star.

== Aftermath ==
On July 30, 2005, the wreck of the Cortland was found by members of the Cleveland Underwater Explorers off Avon Point near Lorain, Ohio in 70 feet of water. The wreck of the Morning Star had been found in 1980.
