= Morning Star (1862 ship) =

1862 steamship sunk in Lake Erie

Coordinates: 41°36′N 82°12′W

History
- Name: Morning Star
- Builder: Alvin A. Turner
- Launched: 1862
- Out of service: June 1868
- Fate: Collided with the Cortland

General characteristics
- Type: Steamship
- Tonnage: 1,075
- Length: 243 ft (74 m)

Morning Star was a steamship owned by the Detroit and Cleveland Navigation Company. In 1868, she sank on Lake Erie off Lorain, Ohio, after colliding with the schooner Cortland, which also sank.

== Background ==
The Morning Star was built and launched in Trenton, Michigan, in 1862. She was 243 feet (74 m) long, 34 feet (10 m) wide, and weighed 1,075 tons.

On September 24, 1866, two men attempted to set her ablaze as part of an insurance fraud scheme. However, a soldier discovered the fire before the flames could consume her.

On June 19 or June 20, 1868, the Morning Star, captained by E.R. Viger, departed Cleveland, bound for Detroit. The ship was carrying an unknown number of passengers and a wide variety of cargo. (Note: The Cleveland Press reported in 1900 that the vessel carried about 130 passengers.)

== The collision ==
Shortly after midnight the next day, Captain G.W. Lawton of the Cortland noticed the Morning Star approaching them after he successfully repaired a lamp. Captain Lawton rang a bell to warn the Morning Star's crew, but it was too late to prevent a collision.

On the Morning Star, Captain Viger attempted to launch the ship's lifeboats, but she sank before they could be lowered. Captain Viger and 14 other people survived the disaster by clinging to the remains of the ship's hurricane deck, which had been torn loose after the collision. Around 3 hours later, the survivors of both ships were rescued by the crew of the R. N. Rice, a sister ship of the Morning Star.

== Aftermath ==
It is unknown how many people died on the Morning Star because many passengers' names were not on the ship's manifest. They also had no friends or family members to report them missing because they were immigrants. Nonetheless, most sources agree that at least 30 people on board the Morning Star perished. (Note: The Cleveland Press in 1900 reported that about 100 people aboard the Morning Star drowned.) Two people on the Cortland died as well.

In April 1980, divers Craig Hampton, Jim Kennard, and Don Muhleman discovered the Morning Star's remains off Lorain, Ohio. The wreck of the Cortland was not located until July 30, 2005.
