= List of shipwrecks in 1913 =

The list of shipwrecks in 1913 includes ships sunk, foundered, grounded, or otherwise lost during 1913.

table of contents
1913
| Jan | Feb | Mar | Apr |
| May | Jun | Jul | Aug |
| Sep | Oct | Nov | Dec |
Unknown date

== January ==
=== 1 January ===
List of shipwrecks: 1 January 1913
| Ship | State | Description |
|---|---|---|
| Town Harbor | United States | The motor boat sank at Black Rock near Bridgeport, Connecticut. |

=== 3 January ===
List of shipwrecks: 3 January 1913
| Ship | State | Description |
|---|---|---|
| C. R. Bennett | United States | The 32 GRT schooner was stranded at the Delaware Breakwater off Lewes, Delaware. The work removing the wreck finished on 19 October. Both people on board survived. |
| El Dorado | United States | The passenger/cargo ship sank in a gale in the Atlantic Ocean south of Cape Hatteras with all 39 hands. |
| Future | United States | The 613 GRT schooner foundered in the Atlantic Ocean east of North Carolina at 34°08′N 075°10′W with the loss of three lives. There were five survivors. |
| Indrakuala | United Kingdom | The steamer was damaged in a collision in thick fog with Julia Luckenbach (United States) in Chesapeake Bay. After the incident she either anchored or was beached to prevent sinking. |
| USS Jamestown | United States Navy | The decommissioned sloop-of-war was destroyed by fire at Norfolk Navy Yard in Portsmouth, Virginia. |
| Julia Luckenbach | United States | The ocean liner was sunk in a collision in thick fog with Indrakuala (United Kingdom) in Chesapeake Bay. Her captain, his wife, and 13 crew were killed. Survivors were rescued by Indrakuala and Pennsylvania (Netherlands). |

=== 4 January ===
List of shipwrecks: 4 January 1913
| Ship | State | Description |
|---|---|---|
| Bombay | United States | The whaleback barge sank in a gale in Nantucket Sound five miles (8.0 km) northwest of Handkerchief Lightship in 36 feet of water. Two crew killed, the other 3 crew rescued by her tow vessel. |
| Ellen W. Moore | United States | The canal boat sank in a gale inside the breakwater at Newhaven, Connecticut. |
| Hattie | United States | The fishing steamer sank at the wharf of the Newport Cold Storage Company, Newport, Rhode Island. |

=== 7 January ===
List of shipwrecks: 7 January 1913
| Ship | State | Description |
|---|---|---|
| Cheslakee | Canada | Cheslakee undergoing salvage The steamer capsized and sank at Van Anda, British Columbia, killing seven people. She was later refloated, repaired, and returned to service. |
| Rosecrans | United States | The oil tanker on her voyage from Monterrey, Mexico, to Portland, Oregon ran into gale of the mouth of the Columbia River and went aground on Peacock Spit. The vessel broke into two and sank with the loss of 30 or 33 of her 36 crew. |
| Socrates | United Kingdom | The 138.5-foot (42.2 m), 296-ton steam trawler was wrecked on rocks in Clanyard Bay, Wigtownshire, United Kingdom in thick fog. The crew managed to scramble ashore, and the vessel slipped into deep water and sank at the next high tide. Declared a total loss and stripped on 21 January. |

=== 10 January ===
List of shipwrecks: 10 January 1913
| Ship | State | Description |
|---|---|---|
| Clara Jane | United States | The 124 GRT schooner was stranded at Eastern Point at Gloucester, Massachusetts. All four people on board survived. |
| James T. Staples | United States | The sternwheel paddle steamer, registered as Jas. T. Staples, was destroyed by a boiler explosion on the Tombigbee River in Alabama six miles (9.7 km) above the current day Coffeeville Lock and Dam. The explosion killed 26 people, including her captain, and injured 21. Survivors were rescued by the sternwheel paddle steamer John Quill (United States). |

=== 12 January ===
List of shipwrecks: 12 January 1913
| Ship | State | Description |
|---|---|---|
| Herman Winter | United States | The steamer stranded near Nixes Mate in the harbor at Boston, Massachusetts in a gale. refloated and returned to service. |
| Uranium | United Kingdom | The passenger ship ran aground on Shoal Point, Chebucto Head, Nova Scotia. All on board, over 900 people, survived. She was later refloated and taken to Halifax, Nova Scotia where temporary repairs were done 26 January–10 February. She then sailed to New York City for permanent repairs. |

=== 13 January ===
List of shipwrecks: 13 January 1913
| Ship | State | Description |
|---|---|---|
| Cobequid | United Kingdom | The passenger ship was wrecked in a severe storm on Trinity Rock near Grand Manan and broke up. |

=== 14 January ===
List of shipwrecks: 14 January 1913
| Ship | State | Description |
|---|---|---|
| California | (Russia) Grand Duchy of Finland | The barque was wrecked on St Mary's Island, Northumberland, United Kingdom with the loss of eight of her crew. She was under tow from Newcastle upon Tyne, Northumberland to Rotterdam, South Holland, Netherlands. |
| Werner Kunstmann | Germany | The vessel ran aground at Lindisfarne, Northumberland and was wrecked. |

=== 16 January ===
List of shipwrecks: 16 January 1913
| Ship | State | Description |
|---|---|---|
| Estonia | Russia | The passenger ship caught fire and was abandoned in the Red Sea off Port Sudan, Egypt. The derelict hulk was sunk by explosives on 23 January. |
| Veronese | United Kingdom | The 7,877 GRT Lamport and Holt Line general cargo/passenger vessel. Sailing from Liverpool with a stop in Vigo, Spain, and carrying 221 people on board to Venezuela, Brazil, and Argentina, collided in fog with rocks near Leça da Palmeira, Portugal. The rescue lasted more than 48 hours due to sea state using cables back and forth and two rescue boats to recover those who threw themselves into the sea. There were 38 casualties, 5 of them crewmen. |

=== 20 January ===
List of shipwrecks: 20 January 1913
| Ship | State | Description |
|---|---|---|
| Brodland | United Kingdom | The steamship was driven ashore and wrecked at Port Talbot, Glamorgan, Wales. Her 42 crew were rescued. She was on a voyage from Port Talbot to Punta Arenas, Chile. |

=== 21 January ===
List of shipwrecks: 21 January 1913
| Ship | State | Description |
|---|---|---|
| Massachusetts | United States | The barge sank off South West Ledge near New London, Connecticut. |

=== 22 January ===
List of shipwrecks: 22 January 1913
| Ship | State | Description |
|---|---|---|
| Ulstermore | United Kingdom | The cargo ship was wrecked on Taylor's Bank, in Liverpool Bay. She was on a voyage from Baltimore, Maryland, United States to Liverpool, Lancashire. |

=== 24 January ===
List of shipwrecks: 24 January 1913
| Ship | State | Description |
|---|---|---|
| Helen | United States | The launch was lost in Galena Bay (60°55′20″N 146°37′00″W) on the south-central coast of the Territory of Alaska after a line fouled her propeller in rough seas. Two men on board lost their lives. |
| Mermaid | United States | The launch was lost in Valdez Narrows (61°03′15″N 146°40′30″W) on the south-central coast of the Territory of Alaska with the loss of one life. Alaska Natives in a bidarka rescued her sole survivor. |

== February ==
=== 1 February ===
List of shipwrecks: 1 February 1913
| Ship | State | Description |
|---|---|---|
| Helen Story | United States | The 58 GRT was stranded on the Matagorda Peninsula on the coast of Texas. All eight people on board survived. |

=== 2 February ===
List of shipwrecks: 2 February 1913
| Ship | State | Description |
|---|---|---|
| City of Georgetown | United States | The 599 GRT schooner was lost in collision with the screw steamer Prinz Oskar (Germany) off the Delaware Capes at the entrance to Delaware Bay. All eight people on board survived. |

=== 3 February ===
List of shipwrecks: 3 February 1913
| Ship | State | Description |
|---|---|---|
| Monarch | United States | The tow steamer sank in Tchula Lake, Mississippi. Five crew drowned. |

=== 7 February ===
List of shipwrecks: 7 February 1913
| Ship | State | Description |
|---|---|---|
| Vasco | United States | The steamer was wrecked/sank at Yabucoa, Puerto Rico. The wreck was removed by June, 1914. |

=== 8 February ===
List of shipwrecks: 8 February 1913
| Ship | State | Description |
|---|---|---|
| Âsâr-ı Tevfik | Ottoman Navy | First Balkan War: The Âsâr-ı Tevfik-class ironclad ran aground on a rock during operations against Bulgarian forces near Yalıköy, Istanbul. The grounded vessel was destroyed by seas and Bulgarian artillery over the next few days. |

=== 10 February ===
List of shipwrecks: 10 February 1913
| Ship | State | Description |
|---|---|---|
| Borealis | United States | The 764 GRT schooner was stranded in the Friendly Islands (now Tonga). All 11 people on board survived. |

=== 13 February ===
List of shipwrecks: 13 February 1913
| Ship | State | Description |
|---|---|---|
| Althea Franklin | United States | The 36 GRT schooner departed Pensacola, Florida, bound for the Campeche Banks off the coast of Mexico with eight people on board and was never heard from again. |
| Epidauro | Austria-Hungary | The steamship ran aground at Overton, Glamorgan, United Kingdom. Her crew were rescued. |
| Pisagua | Norway | She was stranded at Low Island, South Shetland Islands. |

=== 15 February ===
List of shipwrecks: 15 February 1913
| Ship | State | Description |
|---|---|---|
| Bluebell | United Kingdom | The steamship struck rocks in Culver's Hole and was wrecked. Her crew were rescued by the Port Eynon Lifeboat. |

=== 16 February ===
List of shipwrecks: 16 February 1913
| Ship | State | Description |
|---|---|---|
| Advent | United States | The 431 GRT schooner was stranded in Coos Bay on the coast of Oregon. All eight people on board survived. |

=== 26 February ===
List of shipwrecks: 26 February 1913
| Ship | State | Description |
|---|---|---|
| R. Bowers | United States | The schooner went ashore on Long Sand Shoal near Cranes Reef in Long Island Sound. |

=== Unknown date ===
List of shipwrecks: Unknown date February 1913
| Ship | State | Description |
|---|---|---|
| Belovar | United Kingdom | The 125-foot (38 m), 242-ton steam trawler went missing after being spoken to on 6 February at Muldoanich, Barra in the Outer Hebrides. Severe storms in area 7-9 February. Posted as missing on 12 February. Lost with all ten crew. |
| Scow #2 | United States | The Boston Sanitary Department scow sank sometime in February in the area of Boston, Massachusetts. |

== March ==
=== 1 March ===
List of shipwrecks: 1 March 1913
| Ship | State | Description |
|---|---|---|
| Almira | United States | The 26 GRT schooner was stranded at Sand Island on the coast of Alabama. All four people on board survived. |

=== 3 March ===
List of shipwrecks: 3 March 1913
| Ship | State | Description |
|---|---|---|
| John T. Russell | United States | The schooner sank in the long Island Sound one mile (1.6 km) east south east of Shippan Point. Part of her cargo was salvaged. Wreck raised on 23 July 1913. Her spars were removed and she was resunk in deep water. |

=== 6 March ===
List of shipwrecks: 6 March 1913
| Ship | State | Description |
|---|---|---|
| Whitman | United States | The schooner barge broke in two after wrecking on Devils Back in Broad Sound, Boston, Massachusetts. Wreck stripped by the salvage company. Wreckage washed ashore on Deer Island removed in July, another piece washed ashore there in October and was burned. |

=== 7 March ===
List of shipwrecks: 7 March 1913
| Ship | State | Description |
|---|---|---|
| Alum Chine | United Kingdom | The steamship's cargo of dynamite exploded at Baltimore, Maryland in the Patapsco River killing 30 people and injuring 60. |
| Atlantic | United States | The tug was sunk at Baltimore, Maryland, by the explosion of Alum Chine (United Kingdom). Her captain and mate were killed. |
| Unknown barge | United States | A barge/scow was sunk at Baltimore, Maryland, by the explosion of Alum Chine (United Kingdom). She was alongside transferring the cargo of dynamite. |

=== 10 March ===
List of shipwrecks: 10 March 1913
| Ship | State | Description |
|---|---|---|
| Lugano | United Kingdom | The cargo ship was wrecked on Ajax Reef off Key West, Florida. |

=== 19 March ===
List of shipwrecks: 19 March 1913
| Ship | State | Description |
|---|---|---|
| Clydehaugh | United Kingdom | The steam barge foundered in a gale in Caernarfon Bay, while under tow of tug Foam (United Kingdom) from Newlyn to Chester after engine breakdown; crew of three reached Rhosneigr. |

=== 21 March ===
List of shipwrecks: 21 March 1913
| Ship | State | Description |
|---|---|---|
| Albion | United States | The steam schooner went ashore on a reef off Stewart's Point in a storm and broke up. |

=== 26 March ===
List of shipwrecks: 7 March 1913
| Ship | State | Description |
|---|---|---|
| General Scott | United States | The 83 GRT schooner was stranded in Quoddy Bay on the coast of Maine. All three people on board survived. |

=== 27 March ===
List of shipwrecks: 27 March 1913
| Ship | State | Description |
|---|---|---|
| Antioch | United States | The 986 GRT barkentine was stranded at Oquan Beach on the coast of New Jersey. All 10 people on board survived. |

=== Unknown date ===
List of shipwrecks: Unknown March 1913
| Ship | State | Description |
|---|---|---|
| Wyckoff | United States | The lighter was sunk in a collision in the Upper Bay Harbor of New York City. The wreck was removed and cargo salvaged between June and September. |

== April ==
=== 2 April ===
List of shipwrecks: 2 April 1913
| Ship | State | Description |
|---|---|---|
| Clifford N. Carver | United States | The 1,101 GRT four-masted schooner was wrecked on Tennessee Reef in the Florida Keys. All nine people on board survived. |

=== 7 April ===
List of shipwrecks: 7 April 1913
| Ship | State | Description |
|---|---|---|
| Forest City | United States | The schooner was sunk in a collision with Peter in the harbor at Vineyard Haven, Massachusetts. |

=== 15 April ===
List of shipwrecks: 15 April 1913
| Ship | State | Description |
|---|---|---|
| Lyman D. Foster | United States | The 778 GRT schooner, when caught in a hurricane, dismasted, lost all its boats and deck cargo, and was partly filled with water, in the Lau islands of Fiji. All survived, after abandoning the barely floating hull, on 1 May 1913, and making for Kabara using sailing scows that the crew had made themselves. The hull and part of the cargo of lumber were salvaged. |

=== 16 April ===
List of shipwrecks: 16 April 1913
| Ship | State | Description |
|---|---|---|
| Alice Holbrook | United States | The 722 GRT schooner was stranded in Hillsboro Inlet on the coast of Florida. All eight people on board survived. |

=== 18 April ===
List of shipwrecks: 18 April 1913
| Ship | State | Description |
|---|---|---|
| Red Skin | United States | The lighter sank at the New Line Dock at Fall River, Massachusetts. |

=== 19 April ===
List of shipwrecks: 19 April 1913
| Ship | State | Description |
|---|---|---|
| Irene E. Messervey | United States | The schooner caught fire and was beached at Tarpaulin Cove, Massachusetts. |

=== 20 April ===
List of shipwrecks: 20 April 1913
| Ship | State | Description |
|---|---|---|
| Burnside | United States | The 855 GRT schooner foundered in the Atlantic Ocean off the coast of Long Island, New York, 12 nautical miles (22 km; 14 mi) south of the Fire Island Lightship. All four people on board survived. |

=== 21 April ===
List of shipwrecks: 21 April 1913
| Ship | State | Description |
|---|---|---|
| Helena | United States | The 184 GRT schooner was stranded on the coast of Maine near Port Clyde. All six people on board survived. |

=== 26 April ===
List of shipwrecks: 26 April 1913
| Ship | State | Description |
|---|---|---|
| Kate | Germany | The steamer sprang a leak in the North Sea. She was taken under tow by trawler "Aucuba" (United Kingdom), but filled and sank. All crew saved from her boats by Aucuba. |

=== 27 April ===
List of shipwrecks: 27 April 1913
| Ship | State | Description |
|---|---|---|
| Pell S. C. Vought | United States | The schooner broke up after going ashore on Little Gull Island, New York. |

=== 28 April ===
List of shipwrecks: 28 April 1913
| Ship | State | Description |
|---|---|---|
| Francis A. Rice | United States | The schooner ran on the rocks at Nahant, Massachusetts. Salvage operations were abandoned shortly after they were begun, owing to the unfavorable conditions at the location of the wreck. |

=== Unknown date ===
List of shipwrecks: Unknown date April 1913
| Ship | State | Description |
|---|---|---|
| Alex C. Roesch | United States | The dredge burned and sank in Sarasota Bay. The wreck was dragged ashore and burned from 13–20 October 1913. |
| Curacao | United States | The 1,503 GRT, 241.3-foot (73.5 m) steam schooner ran aground on Boulder Spit on Fish Egg Island in the Territory of Alaska. The survey ship USC&GS Thomas R. Gedney and launches USC&GS Cosmos and Launch 117 (all United States Coast and Geodetic Survey) pulled her off on 29–30 April. She returned to service. |
| Hector | United States | The small steamer, which operated as a cannery tender and tugboat in Washington in the San Juan Islands and on Puget Sound, was off Purdy Spit immediately following a boiler refit when she suffered a coal gas explosion and fire. She was towed to shore and burned out. |

== May ==
=== 1 May ===
List of shipwrecks: 1 May 1913
| Ship | State | Description |
|---|---|---|
| Agenoria | United Kingdom | The wooden schooner on voyage from St. Sampson, Guernsey, to Rochester with a cargo of stone, was wrecked on Flat Rock (La Platte), off Saint Sampson, Guernsey. |
| Harold | United States | The dredge burned and sank in the Lindenhurst Canal, Long Island, New York. The wreck was removed on 22 September 1913. |

=== 2 May ===
List of shipwrecks: 2 May 1913
| Ship | State | Description |
|---|---|---|
| Concordia | United States | The steamer struck a railroad bridge in the Tensas River at Clayton, Louisiana. After striking she bounced off, struck it again, and careened over filling with water. The swift flood current carried her 1 1/2 miles (2.4 km) down river before fully sinking. 14 or 22 drowned, with 107 persons saved, many by getting on the bridge. |

=== 11 May ===
List of shipwrecks: 11 May 1913
| Ship | State | Description |
|---|---|---|
| Cadosia | United States | The barge sank in the harbor at Lynn, Massachusetts. |

=== 13 May ===
List of shipwrecks: 13 May 1913
| Ship | State | Description |
|---|---|---|
| Iron City | United States | The schooner barge was cut in two and sunk in a collision with Thomas F. Cole (United States) off Russell Island in 25 to 30 feet (7.6 to 9.1 m) of water in the St. Clair River, a total loss. The wreck was removed in July. |

=== 23 May ===
List of shipwrecks: 23 May 1913
| Ship | State | Description |
|---|---|---|
| Cromdale | United Kingdom | She was wrecked on Bass Point, Cornwall, without loss of life. |

=== 24 May ===
List of shipwrecks: 24 May 1913
| Ship | State | Description |
|---|---|---|
| Chemung | United States | The barge went ashore on Long Sand Shoal in Long Island Sound after breaking from the tow of the tug Fulton (United States). |
| Pohatcong | United States | The barge went ashore on Long Sand Shoal in Long Island Sound after breaking from the tow of the tug Fulton (United States). |
| Shickshinney | United States | The barge went ashore on Long Sand Shoal in Long Island Sound after breaking from the tow of the tug Fulton (United States). |

=== 26 May ===
List of shipwrecks: 26 May 1913
| Ship | State | Description |
|---|---|---|
| Tolmie | United States | The barge was wrecked/sunk in Lake St. Clair off Grosse Pointe, Michigan in a severe storm . The wreck was removed in September. |

=== 30 May ===
List of shipwrecks: 30 May 1913
| Ship | State | Description |
|---|---|---|
| Arcadia | United States | The 127 GRT schooner was stranded at Wolf Cove, Nova Scotia, Canada. All 18 people on board survived. |
| Beatrice L. Corkum | Canada | The schooner ran aground off Clark's Harbor. Refloated, repaired, and returned to service. |
| Dolorito | United States | The 6 GRT sloop was stranded on Roncador Shoal off Fajardo, Puerto Rico. All three people on board survived. |
| Fred C. Holden | United States | The 137 GRT schooner foundered off Damariscotta Island on the coast of Maine. All six people on board survived. |

== June ==
=== 6 June ===
List of shipwrecks: 6 June 1913
| Ship | State | Description |
|---|---|---|
| Kurland | Germany | The ship collided with Deventia (flag unknown) and sank 2 nautical miles (3.7 km) off St Catherine's Point, Isle of Wight, United Kingdom. |

=== 7 June ===
List of shipwrecks: 7 June 1913
| Ship | State | Description |
|---|---|---|
| Oakwoods | United States | The schooner went ashore on Point Judith, Rhode Island. |

=== 11 June ===
List of shipwrecks: 11 June 1913
| Ship | State | Description |
|---|---|---|
| Cañonero General Concha | Spanish Navy | The gunboat — officially classified as a third-class cruiser — ran aground in dense fog on the coast of the Spanish protectorate in Morocco near Alhucemas. Moroccan guerrillas attacked her, and her badly outnumbered crew of 53 defended her successfully for 15 hours until all of her survivors and dead had been transferred to several other Spanish Navy warships, which subsequently drove off the Moroccans with gunfire and then sank General Concha – deemed beyond repair – with gunfire to prevent the Moroccans from looting her wreck. General Concha's crew suffered 16 men dead, 17 wounded, and 11 captured during the engagement; the attacking Moroccans' casualties are not known. |
| Yukon | United States | During a voyage from Goodnews Bay, Territory of Alaska, to Seattle, Washington, with three passengers, a crew of 42, and a cargo of 300 pounds (140 kg) of electrical materials aboard, the 688 GRT, 205-foot (62.5 m) steamer was wrecked in thick fog without loss of life at Petrof Point on Sanak Island in the eastern Aleutian Islands. The revenue cutter USRC Tahoma ( United States Revenue Cutter Service) rescued her passengers and crew. |

=== 13 June ===
List of shipwrecks: 13 June 1913
| Ship | State | Description |
|---|---|---|
| Hustler | United States | The 14 GRT schooner foundered off Youngs Island, South Carolina. Both people on board survived. |

=== 15 June ===
List of shipwrecks: 15 June 1913
| Ship | State | Description |
|---|---|---|
| Paul Palmer | United States | The 276-foot (84 m), 2,193 GRT five-masted schooner caught fire, burned to the waterline, and sank in 85 feet (26 m) of water in Massachusetts Bay 6 nautical miles (11 km; 6.9 mi) northwest of Race Point, Provincetown, Massachusetts. All 11 people on board abandoned ship in lifeboats and were rescued by the fishing schooner Rose Dorothea (flag unknown). Paul Palmer's wreck lies in what is now the Stellwagen Bank National Marine Sanctuary. |
| Unknown barge | United States | A barge broke up in high winds on the breakwater at Cleveland, Ohio after the towline snapped from tow vessel Gillen (United States). The only person on board was rescued by the United States Life Saving Service just before she struck. |

=== 16 June ===
List of shipwrecks: 16 June 1913
| Ship | State | Description |
|---|---|---|
| 817 | United States | The lighter sank at the Edison Electric Light Company dock, South Boston, Massachusetts. |
| Mary Arnold | United States | The tug sank at the entrance to the Cape Cod Canal, Buzzards Bay, Massachusetts. Raised, repaired and returned to service. |

=== 17 June ===
List of shipwrecks: 17 June 1913
| Ship | State | Description |
|---|---|---|
| Olympia | United States | The fishing schooner was sunk in a collision with Sagamore (United Kingdom) off Sable Island, Nova Scotia. Six crew killed. |

=== 18 June ===
List of shipwrecks: 18 June 1913
| Ship | State | Description |
|---|---|---|
| Blue Boy | United States | The barge sank near Faulkners Island, Connecticut. |

=== 21 June ===
List of shipwrecks: 21 June 1913
| Ship | State | Description |
|---|---|---|
| Curacao | United States | Carrying 39 passengers, 51 crewmen, and a 200-ton cargo of general merchandise, the 1,503 GRT, 241.3-foot (73.5 m) steam schooner was wrecked on an uncharted rock on a reef – thereafter known as Curacao Reef (55°39′20″N 133°28′10″W) – 1.5 nautical miles (2.8 km; 1.7 mi) west-southwest of Culebra Island in Tonowak Bay in Southeast Alaska. The survey ship USC&GS Thomas R. Gedney ( United States Coast and Geodetic Survey) rescued everyone on board. Curacao was deemed a total loss. |

=== 24 June ===
List of shipwrecks: 24 June 1913
| Ship | State | Description |
|---|---|---|
| Priscilla | United States | The fishing schooner sank near Commonwealth Dock, South Boston, Massachusetts after being rammed by the steamer Machigonne (flag unknown). |

=== Unknown date ===
List of shipwrecks: unknown date June 1913
| Ship | State | Description |
|---|---|---|
| Toanui | United Kingdom | The Glasgow-registered salvage tug sailed from Gourock on 3 June 1913 on delivery to New Zealand and was lost on the Seven Stones Reef, between Cornwall and the Isles of Scilly. Wreckage, first found on 11 June, was washed up on the North Cornwall coast and around Land's End and Tol Pedn. |

== July ==
=== 5 July ===
List of shipwrecks: 5 July 1913
| Ship | State | Description |
|---|---|---|
| Drill boat #4 | United States | The drill boat sank near the Commonwealth Dock at Boston, Massachusetts after catching and filling on a rising tide. |

=== 6 July ===
List of shipwrecks: 6 July 1913
| Ship | State | Description |
|---|---|---|
| Sweetheart | United States | The schooner burned and sank in the St. Clair River abreast the coal docks at Algonac, Michigan. The wreck was removed in November, or the location is a popular dive site. |

=== 7 July ===
List of shipwrecks: 7 July 1913
| Ship | State | Description |
|---|---|---|
| Lucania | United States | The schooner stranded on the beach at Truro, Massachusetts. |

=== 8 July ===
List of shipwrecks: 8 July 1913
| Ship | State | Description |
|---|---|---|
| Vivid | United Kingdom | The Royal Technical College, Glasgow training ship ran aground and wrecked at Colonsay en route from Glasgow, Renfrewshire to Stornoway on her maiden voyage as a civilian training ship. |

=== 9 July ===
List of shipwrecks: 9 July 1913
| Ship | State | Description |
|---|---|---|
| Martin J. Marran | United States | The fishing steamer went ashore on Sow and Pigs Reef, near Cuttyhunk Island, Massachusetts. Hauled off by USRC Acushnet. |

=== 10 July ===
List of shipwrecks: 10 July 1913
| Ship | State | Description |
|---|---|---|
| The Josephine | United States | The lumber schooner ran aground due to a navigation error 1 1/4 miles (2.0 km) off the entrance to Ocracoke Inlet. Pulled off a week later. |

=== 12 July ===
List of shipwrecks: 12 July 1913
| Ship | State | Description |
|---|---|---|
| Clinton Point | United States | The barge sank at the dock of the Taunton Municipal Lighting Company, Taunton, Massachusetts. |
| J. H. Lunsmann | United States | The schooner was rammed and sank at anchor off the Quarantine Station off Black Point, San Francisco, California. Her 12 crew were rescued. Salvage attempts over six months failed, and the wreck was either blown up by the United States Navy or removed under contract of the US Army Corps of Engineers with completion by 2 May 1914. |

=== 13 July ===
List of shipwrecks: 13 July 1913
| Ship | State | Description |
|---|---|---|
| Jack Horner | United States | The 50 GRT, 72-foot (21.9 m) fishing vessel was destroyed by fire in Lynn Canal in Southeast Alaska. Her crew of six survived. |
| Nat Meader | United States | The schooner went ashore on Fishers Island, New York. |

=== 15 July ===
List of shipwrecks: 15 July 1913
| Ship | State | Description |
|---|---|---|
| K #4 | United States | The 15-ton scow broke loose from her moorings and was wrecked at N Clock Point in Southeast Alaska. |

=== 20 July ===
List of shipwrecks: 20 July 1913
| Ship | State | Description |
|---|---|---|
| Naushon | United States | The yacht went on the rocks at Woods Hole, Massachusetts. The vessel was hauled off. |
| Shinonome | Imperial Japanese Navy | The destroyer was wrecked off the coast of Formosa northwest of Anping. Her wreck broke up and sank on 23 July 1913. |

=== 21 July ===
List of shipwrecks: 25 July 1913
| Ship | State | Description |
|---|---|---|
| Budget | United States | The barge sank at the wharf of Seaconnet Coal Company, Providence, Rhode Island. |

=== 25 July ===
List of shipwrecks: 25 July 1913
| Ship | State | Description |
|---|---|---|
| Millinocket | United States | The steamer was beached at Vineyard Haven, Massachusetts after colliding with the steamer Persian off Pollock Rip. |

=== 26 July ===
List of shipwrecks: 26 July 1913
| Ship | State | Description |
|---|---|---|
| Wolloston | United States | The dredge sank at the wharf at Woods Hole, Massachusetts. |

=== Unknown date ===
List of shipwrecks: Unknown July 1913
| Ship | State | Description |
|---|---|---|
| Wait-A-While | United States | The gasoline supply boat burned and sank in Gravesend Bay Harbor of New York City, near the entrance to Coney Island Creek. The wreck was removed in October. |

== August ==
=== 1 August ===
List of shipwrecks: 1 August 1913
| Ship | State | Description |
|---|---|---|
| Emma Southard | United States | The schooner turned on her beam ends and went aground in the harbor at Duck Island, Connecticut. |

=== 7 August ===
List of shipwrecks: 7 August 1913
| Ship | State | Description |
|---|---|---|
| Lena J. Bateman | United States | The sloop was driven into a marsh in an unknown location in a heavy squall. Refloated. |

=== 10 August ===
List of shipwrecks: 10 August 1913
| Ship | State | Description |
|---|---|---|
| Corson | United States | The motor vessel was lost at Ketchikan, Territory of Alaska. |

=== 14 August ===
List of shipwrecks: 14 August 1913
| Ship | State | Description |
|---|---|---|
| Susanna | | The vessel was wrecked on Zantman's Rock, Isles of Scilly. |

=== 15 August ===
List of shipwrecks: 15 August 1913
| Ship | State | Description |
|---|---|---|
| Dredge #1 | United States | The dredge sank at the Raymond Brothers' dock, South Norwalk, Connecticut. |
| Seddon | United States | The 14 GRT, 52-foot (15.8 m) passenger steamboat sank in Kotzebue Sound off the Territory of Alaska. All three people on board survived. |
| Sudden | United States | The motor vessel was wrecked at Kotzebue, Territory of Alaska. |

=== 16 August ===
List of shipwrecks: 16 August 1913
| Ship | State | Description |
|---|---|---|
| Donaldson | United States | The schooner sank at Cleveland, Ohio. Wreck removed late 1914-early 1915. |

=== 17 August ===
List of shipwrecks: 17 August 1913
| Ship | State | Description |
|---|---|---|
| State of California | United States | Carrying 74 passengers, a crew of 76, and a cargo of about 500 tons of general merchandise, the 2,266 GRT, 300-foot (91.4 m) iron passenger steamer sank in Gambier Bay (57°28′N 133°55′W) in Southeast Alaska after striking an uncharted rock. Thirty-two of the 150 people on board perished. Launches from shore and from the steamer Jefferson (United States) rescued the 118 survivors. |

=== 25 August ===
List of shipwrecks: 25 August 1913
| Ship | State | Description |
|---|---|---|
| Transit | United States | While departing Barrow, Territory of Alaska, on 6 August bound for Seattle, Washington, with a cargo of 100 tons of general merchandise and a crew of 11 on board, the 547 GRT, 165.2-foot (50.4 m) schooner was trapped by ice. On 25 August, the ice crushed her and she was beached about 5 nautical miles (9.3 km) south-southwest of Cape Smyth (71°17′35″N 156°47′15″W) to prevent her from sinking. All on board survived. |
| Wasp | United States | After departing Nunivak Island in the Bering Sea with four crewmen and two passengers aboard, the 17 GRT, 42.2-foot (12.9 m) motor trading schooner was stranded near Cape Avinoff, Territory of Alaska. All six people aboard abandoned ship and survived a five-day voyage to St. Michael, Alaska, in a dory without food or water. During the autumn of 1913, the abandoned Wasp suffered severe ice damage, dragged her anchor during a storm, and sank near the mouth of the Kuskokwim River. |

=== 26 August ===
List of shipwrecks: 26 August 1913
| Ship | State | Description |
|---|---|---|
| Kayak | United States | During a voyage from Seldovia, Territory of Alaska, to Seattle, Washington, the 115 GRT, 91-foot (27.7 m) tug was wrecked during a gale at Point Carrew (59°33′30″N 139°50′15″W) in Yakutat Bay on the south-central coast of the Territory of Alaska. Her crew of 10 abandoned ship in lifeboats and survived. |

=== 27 August ===
List of shipwrecks: 27 August 1913
| Ship | State | Description |
|---|---|---|
| Bakana | United Kingdom | The Elder Dempster 2,802 GRT cargo ship ran aground and was wrecked at Half Assini, Ghana in West Africa. She was carrying a cargo of wood from the West coast of Africa to Liverpool. |

=== 28 August ===
List of shipwrecks: 28 August 1913
| Ship | State | Description |
|---|---|---|
| Geo. W. Wescott | United States | The schooner became water logged in a gale 14 miles (23 km) off Baileys Harbor, Wisconsin in Lake Michigan. She was beached on a mudbank near the Sturgeon Bay Ship Canal. |

=== 30 August ===
List of shipwrecks: 30 August 1913
| Ship | State | Description |
|---|---|---|
| Alice | United States | The tow steamer was sunk when her boilers exploded opposite Glenfield, Pennsylvania, seven miles (11 km) below Pittsburgh in the Ohio River 200 feet (61 m) above Lock No. 2. The ship was later raised. Eight people were killed, six injured. |
| Amaranth | United States | The 1,109-ton, four-masted barkentine was wrecked on the southeastern shore of Jarvis Island in the Pacific Ocean. She became a total loss. |

== September ==
=== 2 September ===
List of shipwrecks: 2 September 1913
| Ship | State | Description |
|---|---|---|
| Richard F. C. Hartley | United States | The schooner was wrecked on the North Carolina coast two miles (3.2 km) from the Chicamacomico Life-Saving Station during a gale. The vessel grounded 1,200 to 1,500 feet (370 to 460 m) offshore and broke up. Two crew were killed while the rest of crew were rescued by the United States Life Saving Service. |

=== 3 September ===
List of shipwrecks: 3 September 1913
| Ship | State | Description |
|---|---|---|
| George W. Wells | United States | 1913 Hurricane No. 4: The schooner was wrecked in a hurricane 500 yards (460 m) off Ocracoke Island, a total loss. The wreck was later burned. All 20 passengers and crew were rescued by the United States Life Saving Service before she broke up. |
| Grace G. Bennett | United States | The schooner was wrecked in a storm near Portsmouth. Her crew was rescued by the United States Life Saving Service. |

=== 6 September ===
List of shipwrecks: 6 September 1913
| Ship | State | Description |
|---|---|---|
| Kittiwake | United States | The 23 GRT, 44.2-foot (13.5 m) fishing vessel was lost off Cape Dezhnev on the coast of Siberia. |

=== 7 September ===
List of shipwrecks: 7 September 1913
| Ship | State | Description |
|---|---|---|
| Kate | United States | The steamer sank in the Savannah River. The wreck was removed by the government. |
| T & J Mulqueen | United States | The coal barge sank in 20 feet (6.1 m) of water east of the channel for the harbor of New York City. The wreck and cargo were removed in September. |

=== 9 September ===
List of shipwrecks: 9 September 1913
| Ship | State | Description |
|---|---|---|
| Agnes G. Donahue | Canada | The schooner was wrecked near the Point Prim Lighthouse, Nova Scotia. Her seven crew were rescued. She was on a voyage from Annapolis, Nova Scotia to Saint John, New Brunswick. |

=== 20 September ===
List of shipwrecks: 20 September 1913
| Ship | State | Description |
|---|---|---|
| Tongrier | Belgium | Ran aground off Saaremaa, Estonia. Raised and towed to Antwerp but declared a constructive total loss and scrapped. |

=== 22 September ===
List of shipwrecks: 22 September 1913
| Ship | State | Description |
|---|---|---|
| Marcus L. Urann | United States | The schooner went ashore on Skiffs Island Shoal, off Chappaquiddick, Martha's Vineyard, Massachusetts in fog and a gale. Refloated, repaired and returned to service. All on board, 11 crew and the wives of the Captain and Steward, were rescued by Prescilla II (United States). |

=== 23 September ===
List of shipwrecks: 23 September 1913
| Ship | State | Description |
|---|---|---|
| Elvira | United States | With a 25-ton cargo of furs and ship's stores on board, the 60-net register ton Arctic motor trading vessel capsized and sank in the Beaufort Sea 5 nautical miles (9.3 km; 5.8 mi) north of Humphrey Point (69°58′45″N 142°31′30″W) on the coast of the Territory of Alaska after she became trapped in ice during a gale. Her crew of 20 survived. |

=== 24 September ===
List of shipwrecks: 24 September 1913
| Ship | State | Description |
|---|---|---|
| Nellie F. Sawyer | United States | The schooner was wrecked in Pollock Rip Channel. Her crew was rescued by the United States Life Saving Service. |

=== 27 September ===
List of shipwrecks: 27 September 1913
| Ship | State | Description |
|---|---|---|
| Ella Strickland | United States | The schooner stranded on shoals at Chincoteague Inlet. Refloated. |
| Tyrone | New Zealand | The steamship ran aground in thick fog at Rerewahine Point, south of Taiaroa Head on the Otago Peninsula. Much of the cargo was recovered but the ship was a total loss. |

=== 28 September ===
List of shipwrecks: 28 September 1913
| Ship | State | Description |
|---|---|---|
| Abbie E. | United States | The launch was sunk in a collision with schooner Rhodora in the harbor of Gloucester, Massachusetts. Three people were killed and two survivors were rescued by Rhodora. |

== October ==
=== 5 October ===
List of shipwrecks: 5 October 1913
| Ship | State | Description |
|---|---|---|
| Louisa | United States | The 5 GRT schooner dragged her anchor during a gale and was wrecked on the beach at Chinik, Territory of Alaska. Her crew of three survived. |

=== 6 October ===
List of shipwrecks: 6 October 1913
| Ship | State | Description |
|---|---|---|
| E. L. Dwyer | United States | After lying on the beach at Teller, Territory of Alaska, since 14 August 1912 without anyone coming aboard to perform maintenance and already in a partly wrecked condition, the 54 GRT motor vessel was destroyed by a gale. |
| Edith | United States | The power boat was wrecked on the jetty of the harbor of Cape May, New Jersey while assisting the United States Life Saving Service retrieve the disabled boat Dorothy (flag unknown). Her engine quit due to a bad generator. |
| Sesnon #3 | United States | The 21-ton barge was wrecked at Nome, Territory of Alaska. |
| Sesnon #21 | United States | While anchored off Nome, Territory of Alaska, with no cargo or crew aboard, the 39-ton barge broke loose from her moorings during a gale, was driven ashore on a beach 2 nautical miles (3.7 km; 2.3 mi) west of Nome, and was broken apart by waves. |
| Swallow | United States | The 9 GRT, 40-foot (12.2 m) sternwheel paddle steamer sank at Nome, Territory of Alaska. |

=== 9 October ===
List of shipwrecks: 9 October 1913
| Ship | State | Description |
|---|---|---|
| Quonapowitt | United States | The fishing schooner went ashore on Cape Cod, Mass., near the Palmetto Life-Saving Station and went to pieces. |
| Volturno | United Kingdom | Volturno The Uranium Line passenger-cargo ship caught fire in mid-Atlantic and was abandoned; 510 passengers and crew were rescued by ships including Kroonland (United States) and Minneapolis (United Kingdom), but 136 died. The derelict ship was scuttled on 18 October in the North Atlantic Ocean. |
| Yorkey | United States | The 7 GRT, 31-foot (9.4 m) motor vessel sank at Nome, Territory of Alaska. Both people on board survived. |

=== 10 October ===
List of shipwrecks: 10 October 1913
| Ship | State | Description |
|---|---|---|
| Kitty | United States | The derrick barge sprang a leak and sank by the edge of the channel of Newtown Creek. The wreck was removed on 5 November. |
| Sophia | United States | The 10 GRT 35-foot (10.7 m) motor vessel sank at Nome, Territory of Alaska. Her crew of four survived. |

=== 11 October ===
List of shipwrecks: 11 October 1913
| Ship | State | Description |
|---|---|---|
| B. H. Warford | United States | The schooner sank in the Taunton River, near Ware, Massachusetts. |

=== 12 October ===
List of shipwrecks: 12 October 1913
| Ship | State | Description |
|---|---|---|
| Nora | United States | After departing St. Michael, Territory of Alaska, on 9 October bound for the Kuskokwim River towing the schooner Princess (United States), the motorboat was found washed up on the beach bottom-up in Norton Sound, apparently having been blown there by a storm. All three people aboard both vessels were lost. |
| Princess | United States | After departing St. Michael, Territory of Alaska, on 9 October bound for the Kuskokwim River under tow by the motorboat Nora (United States) with a cargo of about 10 tons of general merchandise aboard, the 16 GRT, 41.4-foot (12.6 m) schooner was found washed up on the beach bottom-up in Norton Sound, apparently having been blown there by a storm. All three people aboard both vessels were lost. |

=== 13 October ===
List of shipwrecks: 13 October 1913
| Ship | State | Description |
|---|---|---|
| Henry D. May | United States | The schooner sank/swamped off Stone Horse shoal, in Vineyard Sound. Refloated and taken to Vineyard Haven. Six crew was rescued by the United States Life Saving Service. |
| Sumner R. Mead | United States | The schooner was wrecked off Highland Light. |

=== 15 October ===
List of shipwrecks: 15 October 1913
| Ship | State | Description |
|---|---|---|
| Knickerbocker | United States | The barge was beached on Nobska Point near Woods Hole, Massachusetts. |
| Oakland | United States | The schooner barge was sunk and broke up in a gale south east of the Highland Light after being cut loose by her tow vessel Paoli (United States). Two people were killed. |

=== 17 October ===
List of shipwrecks: 17 October 1913
| Ship | State | Description |
|---|---|---|
| Ellida | United States | Carrying a 20-ton cargo of salt, lumber, and general merchandise and a crew of three, the 19 GRT motor vessel was dismasted and wrecked without loss of life on the northeast coast of Unga Island in the Territory of Alaska's Shumagin Islands during a gale and was declared a total loss. |

=== 19 October ===
List of shipwrecks: 19 October 1913
| Ship | State | Description |
|---|---|---|
| Norwalk | United States | The steamer ran aground in a gale off False Presque Isle. She was scuttled to prevent pounding to pieces. She was pulled off by two wrecking tugs on 23 October. |

=== 20 October ===
List of shipwrecks: 20 October 1913
| Ship | State | Description |
|---|---|---|
| Helia | United States | The launch burned and sank three miles (4.8 km) north of Little Beach, New Jersey. The two men on board made it to an island where they were rescued by the United States Life Saving Service. |

=== 21 October ===
List of shipwrecks: 21 October 1913
| Ship | State | Description |
|---|---|---|
| C. W. Elphicke | United States | The steamer struck a submerged obstruction off Long Point, Ontario on Lake Erie in a gale. She was beached just above Long Point Lighthouse, a total loss. |

=== 23 October ===
List of shipwrecks: 23 October 1913
| Ship | State | Description |
|---|---|---|
| Unknown barge | United States | A coal barge was wrecked on Red House Shoals in the Kanawha River. The wreck was removed on 6 November. |

=== 25 October ===
List of shipwrecks: 25 October 1913
| Ship | State | Description |
|---|---|---|
| Duke | United States | The barge ran aground at Promised Land, near New Haven, Connecticut. |
| Rebecca J. Moulton | United States | The schooner went ashore on East Chop, in Vineyard Sound. |

=== 26 October ===
List of shipwrecks: 26 October 1913
| Ship | State | Description |
|---|---|---|
| Henry P. Haven | United States | The schooner was wrecked 30 miles (48 km) off the coast off Point Allerton. |

=== 30 October ===
List of shipwrecks: 30 October 1913
| Ship | State | Description |
|---|---|---|
| Florence Russell | United States | The schooner sank in Long Island Sound off Sheffield Point, New York in 12 fathoms (72 ft; 22 m) of water with her mast tops above water. Parts of the wreck less than 40 feet (12 m) below water were removed in November. |

=== Unknown date ===
List of shipwrecks: Unknown October 1913
| Ship | State | Description |
|---|---|---|
| Unknown scow | | An unregistered scow sank in the Rouge River, Michigan near the foot of Chase Street. The scow was towed out of the channel on 28 October. |

== November ==
=== 1 November ===
List of shipwrecks: 1 November 1913
| Ship | State | Description |
|---|---|---|
| Kake | United States | The gasoline steamer, a salmon packer, was wrecked on the south spit at the mouth of the Columbia River and broke up. |

=== 2 November ===
List of shipwrecks: 2 November 1913
| Ship | State | Description |
|---|---|---|
| Gypsum Emperor | United States | The schooner was abandoned in the north Atlantic Ocean. |

=== 4 November ===
List of shipwrecks: 4 November 1913
| Ship | State | Description |
|---|---|---|
| HMS Empress of India | Royal Navy | The Royal Sovereign-class battleship was sunk as a gunnery target in Lyme Bay, Dorset, England, by the light cruiser HMS Liverpool and battleships HMS Thunderer, HMS Orion, HMS King Edward VII, HMS Neptune, HMS King George V, and HMS Vanguard (all Royal Navy). |
| Wakiva I | United States | The steam yacht ran aground on St. Joseph Island, Texas. Refloated by a tug on 18 November. |

=== 8 November ===
List of shipwrecks: 8 November 1913
| Ship | State | Description |
|---|---|---|
| L. C. Waldo | United States | Great Lakes Storm: The steamer struck Gull Rock off Manitou Island near Keweenaw Point in Lake Superior during a gale, breaking in two. All on board, 22 men and 2 women, were rescued by the United States Life Saving Service. Salvaged in 1914, repaired and return to service as Riverton (Canada). |
| Louisiana | United States | Great Lakes Storm: The steamboat sank in Lake Michigan. All crew members survived. |
| John A. McGean | United States | Great Lakes Storm: The cargo ship sank in Lake Huron with the loss of all 23 crew, last seen on 8 or 9 November, 14 miles (23 km) north of Tawas Point. |
| Turret Chief | Canada | Great Lakes Storm: The steamer was blown ashore at Keweenaw Point. |

=== 9 November ===
List of shipwrecks: 9 November 1913
| Ship | State | Description |
|---|---|---|
| A. J. Miller | United States | The schooner sank in Long Island Sound five miles (8.0 km) from the Stratford Light in 15 fathoms (90 ft; 27 m) of water with her mast tops above water. On 5 February 1914 all parts of the wreck with in 35 feet (11 m) of the surface was removed by the lighter Panuco (United States). |
| Asatsuyu | Imperial Japanese Navy | The destroyer ran aground on a reef in Nanao Bay in the Sea of Japan off Honshu, Japan. Her wreck broke up on 30 November 1913. |
| D. O. Mills | United States | Great Lakes Storm: The steamer ran aground off the Harbor Beach Life-Saving Station, Michigan, solidly on the bottom. She pumped herself out the next night. |
| Charles S. Price | United States | SS Charles S. Price Great Lakes Storm: The cargo ship capsized in Lake Huron with the loss of all 28 crew. She sank on 18 November, 7 or 10 miles (11 or 16 km) north of Port Huron. |
| Edward Buckley | United States | Great Lakes Storm: The lumber steamer dragged anchor and went ashore at Harbor Beach. Later refloated and taken to Detroit, Michigan, for repairs. |
| G. J. Grammer | United States | Great Lakes Storm: The steamer dragged anchor and went ashore at Lorain, Ohio. |
| Harlow | United States | Great Lakes Storm: The steamer was beached on Peach Island after being damaged in a collision with LaBelle (flag unknown). |
| Howard M. Hanna, Jr. | United States | Great Lakes Storm: The steamer was wrecked on Port Austen Reef 1 1/2 miles (2.4 km) offshore of Pointe aux Barques, Michigan, in Lake Huron during a gale. Nine crew made it to shore in her yawl, the rest were rescued by the United States Life Saving Service. Salvaged in 1915, repaired and return to service as Glenshee (Canada). |
| Hydrus | United States | Great Lakes Storm: The ship sank in Lake Huron with the loss of all 28 crew. |
| Isaac M. Scott | United States | Great Lakes Storm: During a voyage from Cleveland, Ohio, to Milwaukee, Wisconsin, with a cargo of coal, the steel-hulled bulk carrier capsized and sank off the coast of Michigan in Lake Huron with the loss of her entire crew of 28. Her wreck lies in 175 feet (53 m) of water at 45.065333°N 83.039217°W. |
| James Carruthers | Canada | Great Lakes Storm: The lake freighter sank in Lake Huron with the loss of all twenty-two crew. |
| Leafield | Canada | Great Lakes Storm: The cargo ship sank in Lake Superior, probably off the Angus Rocks about 14 miles (23 km) southeast of Port Arthur, Ontario, or wrecked on Angus Island with the loss of all 15 or 18 crew. |
| Montoa | United States | Great Lakes Storm: The steamer went on the rocks off Pointe aux Barques in Lake Michigan. A wrecking tug salvaged part of her cargo of coal and took off her crew on 14 November. She was salvaged in 1914 and taken to Sarnia, Ontario for repairs. |
| Regina | Canada | Great Lakes Storm: The lake freighter sank in Lake Huron 10 miles (16 km) north of Point Edward, Ontario with the loss of 32 crew. |
| Rhoda Emily | United States | Great Lakes Storm: The lumber steamer dragged anchor and went ashore at Sand Beach Township, Michigan, or Sand Beach. Later refloated and taken to Detroit, Michigan, for repairs. |
| Victory | United States | Great Lakes Storm: The steamer went ashore at the entrance to the Livingstone Channel. |
| Wexford | Canada | Bodies from Wexford washed ashore near Goderich, Ontario. Great Lakes Storm: The cargo ship sank in Lake Huron with the loss of all 17 or 24 crew. |
| W. G. Pollock | United States | Great Lakes Storm: The steamer grounded in the St. Clair River at the entrance to the St. Clair Ship Canal. |
| Winnie | United States | The 12 GRT, 40-foot (12 m) fishing vessel was stranded on an island 1.33 nautical miles (2.46 km; 1.53 mi) west of Metlakatla in Southeast Alaska. Both crewmembers survived. Winnie later was refloated, repaired, and returned to service. |

=== 10 November ===
List of shipwrecks: 10 November 1913
| Ship | State | Description |
|---|---|---|
| Halstead | United States | Great Lakes Storm: The schooner barge went on the rocks, later a wave put her almost on shore near Washington, Wisconsin. Later refloated. |
| Henry B. Smith | United States | Great Lakes Storm: The lake freighter sank in Lake Superior near Marquette, Michigan with the loss of all twenty-five crew. |
| J. R. Teel | United States | The schooner barge was wrecked at Cape Lookout Beach, Beaufort, North Carolina after she sprung a leak in a gale and became waterlogged, a total loss. Her crew was rescued by her tug, Wellington (United States), except for her cook who drowned during the transfer. |
| Lightship LV 82 | United States Lighthouse Service | Great Lakes Storm: The lightship for Buffalo, New York sank off that port in Lake Erie with the loss of six crew. LV 82 was salvaged in mid-1915, repaired and returned to service. |
| Louisiana | United States | Great Lakes Storm: The ship was driven ashore on Washington Island in Lake Michigan. She caught fire and burned, a total loss. |
| Regina | Canada | Great Lakes Storm: The cargo ship sank in Lake Huron with the loss of all twenty crew. |

=== 11 November ===
List of shipwrecks: 11 November 1913
| Ship | State | Description |
|---|---|---|
| Hydrus | United States | Great Lakes Storm: The ship sank in Lake Huron in 160 feet (49 m) of water with the loss of 24 crew. The wreck was located in 2015. |
| Plymouth | United States | Great Lakes Storm: The ship sank in Lake Michigan off Poverty Island with the loss of seven crew. |

=== 12 November ===
List of shipwrecks: 12 November 1913
| Ship | State | Description |
|---|---|---|
| Unknown barge | United States | A coal barge was wrecked at Lock No. 10 in the Kanawha River. The wreck was removed 24 November. |

=== 19 November ===
List of shipwrecks: 19 November 1913
| Ship | State | Description |
|---|---|---|
| Leonora | United Kingdom | The ketch was in collision with the tug Atlas (United Kingdom) in the Bristol Channel and was abandoned by her crew. Leonora drove ashore at Rotherslade, Glamorgan the next day and was wrecked. |

=== 21 November ===
List of shipwrecks: 21 November 1913
| Ship | State | Description |
|---|---|---|
| San Giorgio | Regia Marina | San Giorgio The armored cruiser ran aground in the Strait of Messina. She was refloated on 10 December, having suffered minor damage. |

=== 22 November ===
List of shipwrecks: 22 November 1913
| Ship | State | Description |
|---|---|---|
| Artebus | United States | The gasoline boat went ashore on a rocky point two miles (3.2 km) north of Charlevoix, Michigan in dense fog. Refloated on 27 November. |
| Bristol | United States | The dredge sank at Providence, Rhode Island. |
| Schnoedon | United States | The barge went ashore on a rocky point two miles (3.2 km) north of Charlevoix, Michigan in dense fog. Refloated on 27 November. |

=== 24 November ===
List of shipwrecks: 24 November 1913
| Ship | State | Description |
|---|---|---|
| Elmer D. Walling | United States | The canal boat sank near Watch Hill, Rhode Island. Later raised. |

=== 26 November ===
List of shipwrecks: 26 November 1913
| Ship | State | Description |
|---|---|---|
| Jennie T. | United States | The fishing steamer went ashore on Groton Long Point, Connecticut. |

=== 26 November ===
List of shipwrecks: 26 November 1913
| Ship | State | Description |
|---|---|---|
| I. W. Nicholas | United States | The steamer stranded on North Point Reef, Thunder Bay, in Lake Superior during a gale. The crew were taken off the next day. She broke in two on 29 November while being towed. The vessel was refloated on 13 December and salvaged in 1914. The steamer was repaired and returned to service as Inland (Canada). |

=== Unknown date ===
List of shipwrecks: Unknown date November 1913
| Ship | State | Description |
|---|---|---|
| Acadian | United States | Great Lakes Storm: The steamer was stranded on a reef one mile (1.6 km) offshore off Sulpher Island, in Thunder Bay, Lake Huron during a gale on 8 or 9 November. Refloated on 19 November and taken to Alpena, Michigan for repairs. |
| Argus | United States | Great Lakes Storm: The cargo ship broke in two and sank in Lake Huron on 9, 10 or 12 November, with the loss of all 24 crew. |
| J. Rafferty | United States | The canal boat sank in the Gowanus Creek Harbor of New York City sometime in November. The wreck was removed in March 1914. |

== December ==
=== 1 December ===
List of shipwrecks: 1 December 1913
| Ship | State | Description |
|---|---|---|
| Balboa | United States | The schooner was wrecked at Grays Harbor, Washington. Her crew was rescued by the United States Life Saving Service |
| Bender Brothers | United States | The 80-net register ton, 77.5-foot (23.6 m) schooner was destroyed by fire at Seattle, Washington. |
| Uralets | Imperial Russian Navy | The gunboat ran aground at Sevastopol and was wrecked by surf. |

=== 2 December ===
List of shipwrecks: 2 December 1913
| Ship | State | Description |
|---|---|---|
| Hoche | French Navy | The battleship was sunk as a target by the battleship Jauréguiberry and the armored cruiser Pothuau (both French Navy). |

=== 5 December ===
List of shipwrecks: 5 December 1913
| Ship | State | Description |
|---|---|---|
| Risør | Norway | The lifeboat with four crew members disappeared in a storm off Risør, Norway. |

=== 10 December ===
List of shipwrecks: 10 December 1913
| Ship | State | Description |
|---|---|---|
| HMS C14 | Royal Navy | The C-class submarine sank without loss of life after colliding with the hopper barge Hopper No. 27 (flag unknown) in Plymouth Sound. She was refloated, repaired, and returned to service. |

=== 12 December ===
List of shipwrecks: 12 December 1913
| Ship | State | Description |
|---|---|---|
| Kwango | Norway | The barque ran aground off Bryon Island, St Lawrence River, Canada and wrecked. |

=== 15 December ===
List of shipwrecks: 15 December 1913
| Ship | State | Description |
|---|---|---|
| Narvik | Germany | The cargo ship capsized off Borkum, Germany. |

=== 19 December ===
List of shipwrecks: 19 December 1913
| Ship | State | Description |
|---|---|---|
| Jeanie | | The steamer was wrecked in Queen Charlotte Sound on the south end of Calvert Island in British Columbia. |
| Rose A | United States | The wrecking lighter struck a boulder and sank at Frost Creek, Locust Valley, New York. |

=== 20 December ===
List of shipwrecks: 20 December 1913
| Ship | State | Description |
|---|---|---|
| Beryl | United Kingdom | The 694 GRT, 211.7-foot (64.5 m) steam yacht was gutted by fire in Rosneath Bay, Scotland. |

=== 22 December ===
List of shipwrecks: 22 December 1913
| Ship | State | Description |
|---|---|---|
| J. H. Crockett | United States | The 15 GRT, 64.6-foot (19.7 m) motor vessel was destroyed by fire in Smugglers Cove (55°34′30″N 131°56′00″W) in Helm Bay (55°37′30″N 131°57′40″W) in Southeast Alaska. |

=== 23 December ===
List of shipwrecks: 23 December 1913
| Ship | State | Description |
|---|---|---|
| Leconfield | United Kingdom | The dredge sank at the entrance to Courtney Bay, Saint John, New Brunswick, after an anchor picked up by one of her buckets pierced one of her pontoons. |

=== 26 December ===
List of shipwrecks: 26 December 1913
| Ship | State | Description |
|---|---|---|
| A. G. Ropes | United States | The schooner barge was cut loose in heavy weather by its tow vessel Edgar F. Luckenbach (United States) four miles (6.4 km) north of Barnegat, New Jersey. She was anchored just offshore and was dashed to a sinking mass by contact with Undaunted that she was still tied to, with the loss of all five hands. |
| Undaunted | United States | The schooner barge was cut loose in heavy weather by its tow vessel Edgar F. Luckenbach (United States) four miles (6.4 km) north of Barnegat, New Jersey. She was dashed by A. G. Ropes that she was still tied to, breaking in two with the loss of all five hands. |

=== 27 December ===
List of shipwrecks: 27 December 1913
| Ship | State | Description |
|---|---|---|
| Princess Louise | United Kingdom | The 133.3-foot (40.6 m), 289.3-ton trawler ran aground and settled by the stern west of Root Var in the vicinity of the Lodingen Light. The crew were rescued by a Norwegian coaster. Princess Louise was written off as lost on 3 March 1914, but had been salvaged, repaired and returned to service by 30 September 1914. |

=== 28 December ===
List of shipwrecks: 28 December 1913
| Ship | State | Description |
|---|---|---|
| Laverna | United States | The fishing schooner went ashore on Ram Head in the harbor at Boston, Massachusetts. |
| Union | United States | The 8 GRT, 38-foot (11.6 m) motor vessel and her crew of two disappeared during what was to have been a five-hour voyage in the Territory of Alaska from Lituya Bay to Dixon Harbor. |

== Unknown date ==
List of shipwrecks: Unknown date 1913
| Ship | State | Description |
|---|---|---|
| Balmes | Spain | The passenger steamer caught fire in the Atlantic Ocean. The ocean liner Pannonia (United Kingdom) rescued 103 people from Balmes, which was towed to St. George's, Bermuda, by the tugs Gladisfen (flag unknown) and Powerful (flag unknown), convoyed by Pannonia. |
| USS Craven | United States Navy | The torpedo boat was sunk as a target. |
| Florence J. | United States | The oil service vessel capsized in Puget Sound immediately after being launched at Dockton, Washington, in either 1913 or 1914. She was righted, completed, and eventually entered service. |
| Gen. C. B. Comstock | United States | The US Army Corps of Engineers hopper dredge burned and sank just north of the entrance to Freeport, Texas. The wreck was located in August 1988. |
| Iris | United States | The schooner ran aground and sank in Lake Michigan off the coast of Washington Island in Door County, Wisconsin, United States. |
| Kommandøren | Norway | The passenger-cargo steamer ran aground in Herdlefjorden, Norway. She was refloated, repaired, and returned to service. |
| Mary Hagan | United States | The barge had sunk by August in Frankford Creek, Pennsylvania 50 feet (15 m) above the drawbridge of Bridge Street, Philadelphia. Wreck removal was finished by 16 October. |
| Northwind | United States | The schooner was wrecked at Wrangell, Territory of Alaska, and became a total loss. |
| USS Santee | United States Navy | The decommissioned frigate was burned at Boston, Massachusetts, as a means of disposal and to ease the recovery of copper and brass in her hull. |

== Sources ==
- Killman, Daniel (2016). Forty Years Master: A Life in Sail & Steam. Edited and annotated by John Lyman and Harold D. Huycke Jr.; compiled by Rebecca Huycke Ellison; with an introduction by Brian J. Rouleau and an afterword by David Hull. College Station: Texas A & M University Press. ISBN 9781623493806. OCLC 931226756.
