= Balmes (disambiguation) =

Jaime Balmes (1810–1848) was a Spanish Catholic priest known for his political and philosophical writing.

Balmes may also refer to:

- Balmes (A Better Life), a 2001 song by German DJ Ian Pooley
- Abraham de Balmes (died 1523), Italian Jewish physician and translator
- José Balmes (1927–2016), Spanish-Chilean painter
- SS Balmes, a Spanish steamship that caught fire in 1913
- Balmes (insect), a genus of silky lacewings in the family Psychopsidae

== See also ==
- Balme, Italy
