= USC&GS Explorer (1904) =

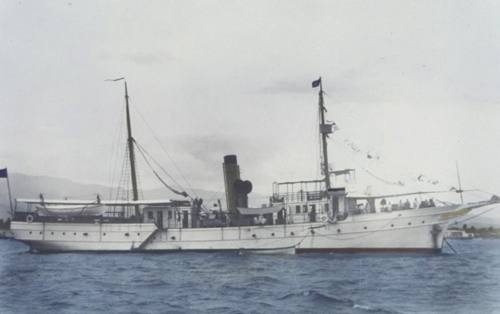
- USC&GS Explorer

History

United States
- Name: Explorer
- Namesake: Explorer, a person who engages in the process of exploration, an activity which has some expectation of discovery
- Operator: United States Coast and Geodetic Survey
- Builder: Pusey & Jones, Wilmington, Delaware
- Yard number: 316
- Completed: 1904
- Acquired: 30 November 1904
- Commissioned: 29 December 1904
- Identification: GVWJ
- Fate: Transferred to United States Navy 3 June 1918
- Acquired: 31 March 1919 (returned by U.S. Navy)
- Recommissioned: February 1920
- Decommissioned: Fall 1939
- Fate: Transferred to National Youth Administration 1939

United States
- Name: Explorer
- Operator: United States Navy
- Acquired: 22 May 1918
- Commissioned: 3 June 1918
- Decommissioned: 31 March 1919
- Fate: Returned to U.S. Coast and Geodetic Survey 31 March 1919
- Notes: Operated as patrol vessel

United States
- Name: Explorer
- Operator: National Youth Administration
- Acquired: 1939
- Fate: Acquired by United States Army 1941

United States
- Name: Atkins (FS 237)
- Operator: United States Army
- Acquired: 1941
- Notes: Classified as "freight and supply ship" (FS); operated by United States Army Corps of Engineers as survey ship

General characteristics
- Type: Survey ship
- Tonnage: 335 GRT
- Displacement: 450 tons
- Length: 147 ft (44.8 m) (overall); 139 ft (42.4 m) (between perpendiculars)
- Beam: 27 ft (8.2 m)
- Draft: 8 ft 7.5 in (2.6 m) mean at 450 ton displacement
- Depth: 14 ft 6.5 in (4.4 m)
- Propulsion: Steam engine, one shaft
- Sail plan: Schooner rig
- Speed: 10.3 knots (19.1 km/h; 11.9 mph)
- Crew: 43 (7 officers, 36 men)

The first USC&GS Explorer was a steamer that served as a survey ship in the United States Coast and Geodetic Survey from 1904 to 1939 except for a brief time in United States Navy service from 1918 to 1919 for patrol duty in Alaskan waters as USS Explorer during World War I. After initial service along the United States East Coast and off Puerto Rico, the ship transferred to Seattle, Washington in 1907 to begin survey work in Alaskan waters during summer and more southern waters along the United States West Coast in winter. On her return from the Navy in 1919, the ship was condemned and due to be sold but instead was retained as a survey vessel into the fall of 1939. After a stint with the National Youth Administration from 1939 to 1941, she saw service during World War II with the United States Army Corps of Engineers as the freight and supply ship Atkins (FS 237).

== Construction and characteristics as built ==
Explorer was built by Pusey & Jones of Wilmington, Delaware, with yard number 316 and delivered to the U.S. Coast and Geodetic Survey on 30 November 1904.

Explorer was schooner-rigged with two masts with sails which were intended to steady the ship, not for propulsion. Propulsion was by means of a steam engine with cylinders of 13 in (33.0 cm) and 26 in (66.0 cm) with a 20 in (50.8 cm) stroke driving a single 7 ft 6 in (2.3 m) bronze propeller. A boiler 10 ft 6 in (3.2 m) in diameter and 11 ft (3.4 m) long provided steam. The Coast and Geodetic Survey intended the ship to perform extensive magnetic survey work in which the extensive of metal in her construction would distort observations, so she was constructed primarily of wood, with metal used only when needed and where it could be used "without defeating the purpose of the wooden hull." The hull's length was 147 ft (44.8 m) overall an 139 ft (42.4 m) between perpendiculars, its extreme beam was 27 ft (8.2 m), and its depth was 14 ft 6.5 in (4.4 m). Displacement was 450 tons on a mean draft of 8 ft 7.5 in (2.6 m).

Explorer′s registry information for 1906 shows a vessel of 335 GRT with the signal letters GVWJ, a speed of 10.3 kn (11.9 mph; 19.1 km/h), an 85-ton coal capacity, and a crew of seven officers and 36 men.

== Service history ==
=== U.S. Coast & Geodetic Survey service, 1904–1918 ===
Explorer was commissioned on 29 December 1904 but was weatherbound at Wilmington until 9 March 1905, at which time she departed for Puerto Rico. She began magnetic observations at Norfolk, Virginia, and continued them during the remainder of the voyage. She then commenced hydrographic surveys and updating United States Coast Pilot information. After completing her work at Puerto Rico, she proceeded to Baltimore, Maryland, making magnetic observations during the voyage. She arrived at Baltimore on 21 June 1905 and began repairs.

Explorer left Baltimore on 26 July 1905 and reached Rockland, Maine, on 30 July 1905 to begin surveys. The cruise lasted until 2 November 1905, when Explorer returned to Baltimore for repairs. She got underway again on 4 January 1906 for the winter survey season, bound for the south coast of Puerto Rico, taking magnetic observations on the voyage. She arrived off Puerto Rico on 20 January 1906. She completed her surveys on 28 May 1906 and on 5 June 1906 arrived at Baltimore, where she undertook repairs. Explorer left Baltimore for northern surveys on 23 July 1906, working until the end of the season on 11 December 1906.

Explorer returned to Baltimore on 15 December 1906 for repairs before a major transfer in operations. On 19 February 1907 she departed Baltimore for Seattle, Washington by way of the Strait of Magellan, making magnetic observations during the voyage. On 3 July 1907 she reached San Diego, California, and she arrived at Seattle on 15 July 1907. On 17 August 1907, she sailed for the District of Alaska, beginning a pattern of conducting surveys in the north in Alaskan waters during summer and to the south along portions of the United States West Coast in winter. On 12 November 1907, her launch was run down by the steamer Indianapolis in thick fog at Seattle, and two of four crewmen aboard the launch drowned in the incident.

=== U.S. Navy service, 1918–1919 ===
The United States entered World War I in April 1917, and Explorer was transferred to the United States Navy on 22 May 1918 for war service as a patrol vessel. The Navy commissioned her as USS Explorer on 3 June 1918. The ship was assigned to patrol the canneries and fishing grounds of what was by then the Territory of Alaska, including Prince William Sound. The ship. along with USC&GS Patterson and the U.S. Navy submarine chasers USS SC-309 and USS SC-310, was assigned the patrol duty as a result of rumors of German and Industrial Workers of the World activity among the cannery and fishery workers. The Navy returned Explorer to the Coast and Geodetic Survey on 31 March 1919.

=== U.S. Coast and Geodetic Survey service, 1919–1939 ===
Upon Explorer′s return from naval service, she was condemned in anticipation of selling her, and the Coast and Geodetic Survey laid up her up at Seattle. However, the Coast and Geodetic Survey director's annual report for fiscal year 1920, covering 1 July 1919 to 30 June 1920, contained an entire section dealing with the urgent need to survey Alaskan waters to enable commerce to develop in the Territory of Alaska. The report emphasized the shortage and limitations of vessels. Explorer thus was put back in commission for Coast and Geodetic Survey work in February 1920. The ship was equipped for wire-drag surveying and to serve as mother ship for smaller vessels, and the survey launches USC&GS Helianthus and USC&GS Scandinavia (Note: The survey launches served on the section patrol during U.S. Navy World War I service as USS Helianthus (SP-585) and USS Scandinavia (SP-3363),) both of which had been repaired after World War I U.S. Navy service on the section patrol, were assigned to her. The vessels proceeded to Alaska for triangulation, topographic survey, and hydrographic survey of Stephens Passage.

Explorer continued in service, and appears in the Coast and Geodetic Survey annual reports and the United States registry under "Vessels of the Coast and Geodetic Survey," into 1939. With a new survey ship, also named USC&GS Explorer (OSS 28), due to enter service in the Coast and Geodetic Survey in the spring of 1940, Explorer performed her final work for the Survey in Puget Sound in the fall of 1939 and was decommissioned after 35 years of service.

=== Later career ===
After her decommissioning, Explorer was transferred to the National Youth Administration in 1939. In 1941, the United States Army acquired her, converted her into a "freight and supply ship" (FS), and renamed her Atkins (FS 237). The United States Army Corps of Engineers then used her for hydrographic survey work during World War II.

== See also ==
- USC&GS McArthur (1874)
- USC&GS Cosmos
- USC&GS Guide (1918)
