= USC&GS McArthur =

USC&GS McArthur was the name of two United States Coast and Geodetic Survey ships, and may refer to:

- USC&GS McArthur (1874), a survey ship in service in the United States Coast Survey from 1876 to 1878 and the Coast and Geodetic Survey from 1878 to 1915
- USC&GS McArthur (MSS 22), a survey ship in service in the Coast and Geodetic Survey from 1966 to 1970 and in the National Oceanic and Atmospheric Administration from 1970 to 2003 as NOAAS McArthur (S 330)
