= USS Helianthus =

Patrol vessel of the United States Navy

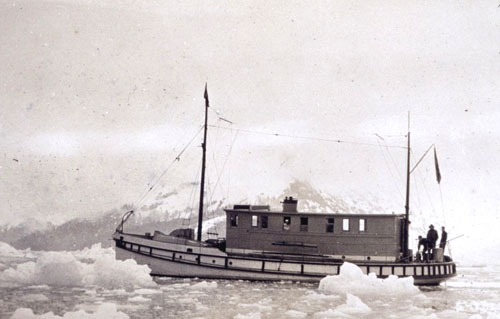
- USC&GS Helianthus in northern waters, outfitted with an antenna wire for radio acoustic ranging operations

History

United States Navy
- Name: Helianthus
- Namesake: Helianthus, the genus to which sunflowers belong (previous name retained)
- Builder: Herreshoff Manufacturing Company, Bristol, Rhode Island
- Yard number: 288
- Launched: 17 June 1912
- Completed: 1912
- Acquired: by Navy: 11 June 1917
- Commissioned: 6 July 1917
- Identification: As yacht; Official number: 210121; Signal letters: LCKT
- Fate: Transferred to United States Coast and Geodetic Survey 28 March 1919
- Notes: In use as private motorboat Helianthus 1912–1917

U.S. Coast and Geodetic Survey
- Name: USC&GS Helianthus
- Namesake: Previous name retained
- Acquired: 28 March 1919
- Commissioned: 1919
- Decommissioned: 1939
- Fate: Sold 1939

General characteristics (as yacht 1913)
- Tonnage: 35 GRT
- Length: 60.5 ft (18.4 m) registered
- Beam: 12.73 ft 6 in (4.03 m)
- Depth: 6.7 ft (2.0 m)
- Propulsion: Gasoline engine, 50 indicated hp
- Crew: 3 excluding master

General characteristics (as U.S. Navy vessel)
- Type: Patrol vessel
- Displacement: 37 tons
- Length: 64 ft (20 m)
- Beam: 13 ft 6 in (4.11 m)
- Draft: 3 ft 3 in (0.99 m)
- Propulsion: Gasoline engine
- Speed: 10 knots
- Armament: 1 × 1-pounder gun

General characteristics (as U.S. Coast and Geodetic Survey vessel)
- Type: Survey launch
- Length: 64 ft (20 m)
- Beam: 13 ft 6 in (4.11 m)
- Draft: 4 ft (1.2 m)

USS Helianthus (SP-585) was a patrol vessel in commission in the United States Navy from 1917 to 1919, seeing service in World War I. After her U.S. Navy service, she was in commission in the United States Coast and Geodetic Survey as the survey launch USC&GS Helianthus from 1919 to 1939. She was named after the Helianthus, the genus to which the sunflower belongs.

== Construction ==
Helianthus was designed by Nathanael Greene Herreshoff and built by the Herreshoff Manufacturing Company as a power yacht at Bristol, Rhode Island. Helianthus, yard number 288, official number 210121, was launched on 17 June 1912. Registry information for 1913 shows the yacht with home port of Bristol, gasoline powered at 50 indicated horsepower, with signal letters LCKT, 35 GRT, 60.5 ft (18.4 m) registered length, 12.7 ft (3.9 m) breadth, 6.7 ft (2.0 m) depth with a crew, excluding master, of three. The yacht was powered by a Sterling Model B, 6 cylinder, 75 horsepower gasoline engine with a 37 in (0.94 m), three bladed propeller.

== United States Navy service, 1917–1919 ==
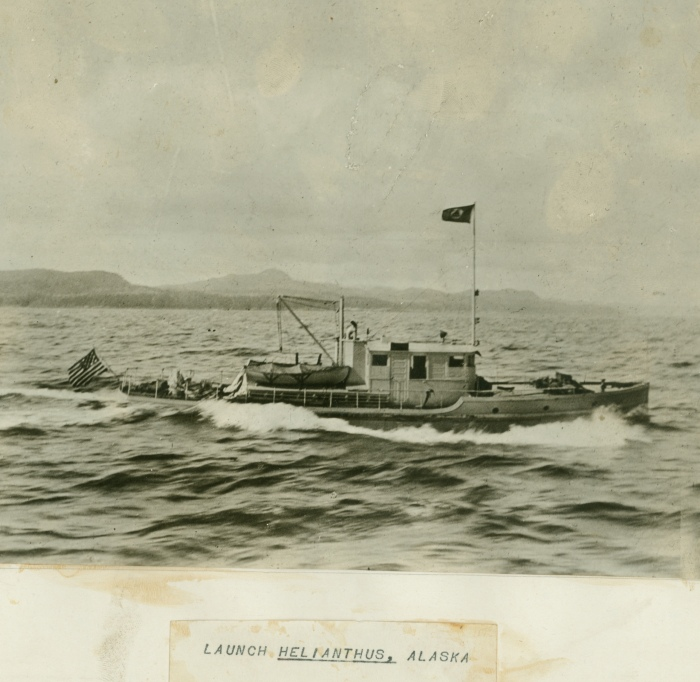
USC&GS Helianthus in Alaskan waters, ca. 1925. She flies the U.S. Coast and Geodetic Survey flag from her mast and the national ensign at her stern.

The U.S. Navy acquired Helianthus from her owner, N. A. Herreshoff, on 11 June 1917 for World War I service as a patrol vessel and commissioned her on 6 July 1917 as USS Helianthus (SP-585).

Helianthus was assigned to section patrol duty in the 2nd Naval District in southern New England during World War I. She operated on harbor patrol and harbor entrance patrol in Narragansett Bay and at Newport, Rhode Island.

Helianthus collided with the fishing vessel T.H.C. on 12 June 1918 off Warren, Rhode Island. The owner of T.H.C., the Warren Oyster Company, filed for $3,840.56 in damages, but was granted only $50.00 in compensation by the United States Congress. (Note: A message was sent to the United States House of Representatives saying: SIR: I have the honor to transmit herewith, for the consideration of Congress, in accordance with the provisions of the act of June 24, 1910 (Stat., p. 607), a communication from the acting secretary of the Navy of the 20th instant, submitting an estimate of appropriation, in the sum of $3,840.56, to pay for claims of damages by naval vessels adjusted by the Navy Department. — Carter Glass, Congressional Edition Volume 7645 The Speaker of the House of Representatives responded, writing: SIR: This department has considered, ascertained, adjusted, and determined the respective amounts due to claimants on account of damages for which vessels of the United States Navy were found to be responsible in the following described instances: 1. The owner of the boat T. H. C. for damages sustained by said boat as a result of a collision with the U. S. S. Helianthus S. P. 585, at Warren, R.I. on June 12, 1918, $50. The correspondence in the department indicates that the owner of the boat T. H. C. is the Warren Oyster Co. of Warren R. I.; — Frederick H. Gillett, Congressional Edition Volume 7645)

== United States Coast and Geodetic Survey service, 1919–1939 ==
The U.S. Navy transferred Helianthus to the United States Coast and Geodetic Survey on 28 March 1919. Commissioned as USC&GS Helianthus, she served as a survey launch during her years with the Coast and Geodetic Survey, conducting hydrographic survey work primarily in the waters of the Territory of Alaska.

After undergoing repairs, Helianthus began survey operations. Her first survey season was in 1920, during which she served along with another former U.S. Navy section patrol boat, USC&GS Scandinavia, and a 30-foot (9.1 m) launch as a tender to the survey ship USC&GS Explorer in triangulation, topographic and hydrographic surveys in Stephens Passage in the Alexander Archipelago in Southeast Alaska.

The Coast and Geodetic Survey sold Helianthus in 1939, and her subsequent fate is unknown. The Survey replaced her in 1940 with the survey vessel USC&GS Lester Jones (ASV-79).
