= USC&GS Thomas R. Gedney =

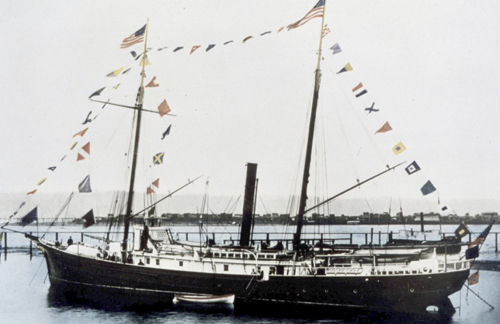
- Thomas R. Gedney dressed overall for a holiday.

History

United States
- Name: USC&GS Thomas R. Gedney
- Namesake: Commander Thomas R. Gedney (d. 1857), United States Coast Survey officer
- Builder: C. H. Decameter, New York, New York
- Cost: $63,400 (USD)
- Completed: 1875
- Commissioned: 1875
- Decommissioned: 1915
- Fate: Stricken 1915

General characteristics
- Type: Survey ship
- Length: 140 ft (43 m)
- Beam: 23.8 ft (7.3 m)
- Draught: 8.4 ft (2.6 m)
- Propulsion: Steam and sail
- Sail plan: Schooner rig

USC&GS Thomas R. Gedney, originally USCS Thomas R. Gedney, was a survey ship in service in the United States Coast Survey from 1875 to 1878 and in the United States Coast and Geodetic Survey from 1878 to 1915.

== Service history ==
Thomas R. Gedney was a composite wood and iron steamship built by C. H. Decameter at New York City in 1875. She entered service with the Coast Survey that year. When the Coast Survey was reorganized in 1878 to form the Coast and Geodetic Survey, she became part of the Coast and Geodetic Survey fleet. She served along both the United States East Coast and United States West Coast, and operated a great deal in the waters of the Territory of Alaska. Future rear admiral Uriel Sebree briefly served as her commanding officer in 1879.

In October 1903, Thomas R. Gedney was operating in Alaska when found the steamer Farallon anchored in Frederick Sound with a broken propeller shaft and more than 100 passengers were on board. She towed Farallon to Tonka Cannery in Wrangell Narrows, where Farallon transferred her passengers and got further assistance.

On 12 July 1905, Thomas R. Gedney's chief writer, P. H. Coning, drowned when the ship's whaleboat capsized off the coast of Alaska. She suffered another tragedy on 30 May 1908 when a Quartermaster Gunderson fell overboard and drowned.

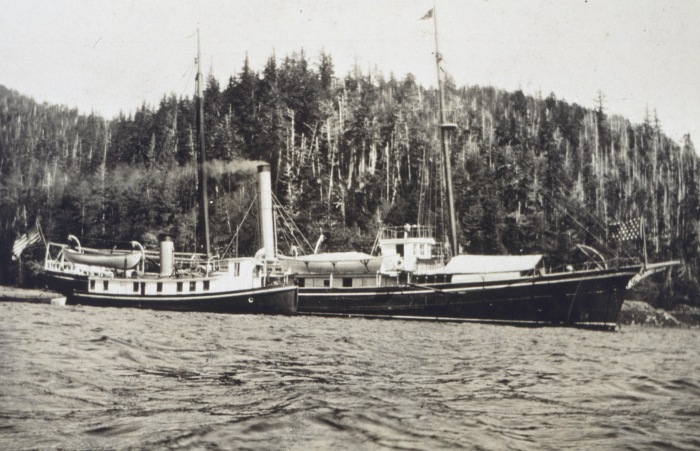
Thomas R. Gedney (rear) in the Territory of Alaska with the U.S. Coast and Geodetic Survey launch USC&GS Cosmos alongside.

Thomas R. Gedney twice came to the assistance of the Pacific Coast Steamship Company 1,503-gross register ton, 241.3-foot (73.5 m) steam schooner SS Curacao in 1913. On 29–30 April she joined the Coast and Geodetic Survey launches USC&GS Cosmos and Launch 117 in helping to pull Curacao off Boulder Spit on Fish Egg Island in the Territory of Alaska. On 21 June, Curacao was wrecked on an uncharted rock on a reef – thereafter known as Curacao Reef (55°39′20″N 133°28′10″W) – 1.5 nautical miles (2.8 km; 1.7 mi) west-southwest of Culebra Island in Tonowak Bay in Southeast Alaska; Thomas R. Gedney rescued everyone on board – 39 passengers and 51 crewmen – and took them to Ketchikan, Alaska, 140 nautical miles (260 km; 160 mi) from the scene of the wreck.

On 16 January 1915, Thomas R. Gedney was at Seattle, Washington when a fire broke out on the docks there. She assisted in fighting the fire, but suffered slight damage and was unable to move because she did not have steam up. The Coast and Geodetic Survey survey ship USC&GS Explorer, which had steam up, towed both Thomas R. Gedney and the survey ship USC&GS McArthur to a safe location. On 12 June 1915, Thomas R. Gedney came to the assistance of the fishing schooner Polaris, which had run aground on Klawack Reef at the north end of Fish Egg Island in Alaska, and helped to refloat Polaris. Thomas R. Gedney was retired from service later in 1915.
