= RMS Pannonia =

Former Cunard ocean liner and WW1 troop ship

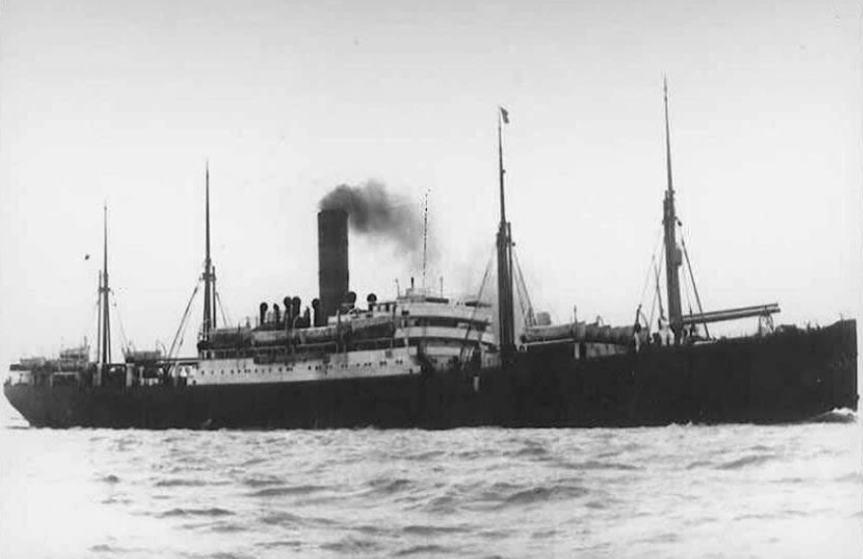

History

United Kingdom
- Name: RMS Pannonia
- Namesake: Pannonia
- Owner: Cunard Line
- Port of registry: Liverpool
- Route: Trieste – Fiume – Palermo – New York
- Builder: John Brown & Company, Clydebank
- Yard number: 348
- Launched: 5 September 1902
- Maiden voyage: 15 May 1903
- Identification: UK official number 118080; code letters VPTN; call sign MNA
- Fate: Sold for scrap, 9 October 1922

General characteristics
- Type: Transatlantic ocean liner
- Tonnage: 9,851 GRT, 6,210 NRT
- Length: 486.5 ft (148.3 m)
- Beam: 59.3 ft (18.1 m)
- Depth: 33.0 ft (10.1 m)
- Installed power: 2 × triple-expansion engines; 811 NHP
- Propulsion: 2 × screw propellers
- Speed: 13 kn (24 km/h)
- Capacity: 2,426 passengers: 1st class: 90; 2nd class: 70; 3rd class: 2,266
- Notes: Her funnel carried the Furness Withy colours of red with a black top and three narrow black bands.

RMS Pannonia was a transatlantic Cunard Liner that was built in Scotland in 1902 and scrapped in Germany in 1922.

== Building ==
Furness Withy ordered the ship from John Brown & Company of Clydebank, Glasgow, but Cunard bought her before her launch on 5 September 1902. She was a twin-screw steamer, with a pair of three-cylinder triple-expansion engines whose combined rating was 811 NHP.

== Career ==
On 15 May 1903 Pannonia began her maiden voyage, which was from Trieste via Fiume and Palermo to New York City. Her Master from 1 January 1911 until January 1912 was Captain Arthur Rostron, who later rescued survivors of RMS Titanic. He was succeeded by Captain Robert Capper, under whose command in November 1913 Pannonia rescued 103 passengers from the Spanish steamship Balmes, which was on fire. In May 1916 Pannonia became a troop ship, carrying troops from Canada to France.

Pannonia left New York for the last time on 18 April 1922, calling at Plymouth and Cherbourg and ending her crossing at Hamburg. There she was laid up until she was sold for scrap on 9 October.
