= Abraham de Balmes =

Italian Jewish physician and translator

Abraham de Balmes ben Meir (born at Lecce, in the kingdom of Naples; died at Venice, 1523) was an Italian Jewish physician and translator of the early 16th century.

A short time before his death he was physician in ordinary to the cardinal Dominico Grimani at Padua. See Steinschneider, "Hebr. Bibl." xxi. 7 and 67; "Hebr. Uebers." p. 62; Perles, "Beiträge," pp. 193, 197, etc.

Through his Latin translations of many Hebrew works on philosophy and astronomy he attained a great reputation in the Christian world. He dedicated to Cardinal Grimani two of these translations: (1) of an astronomical work in Arabic by Ibn al-Heitham (died 1038), which had been translated into Hebrew by Jacob ben Machir, in 1372, under the title "Liber de Mundo"; (2) of the "Farewell Letter" of the Arabic philosopher Ibn Bajjah (Avempace), which he translated from the Hebrew under the title "Epistolæ Expeditionis" (MS. Vat. No. 3897. The dedication is published in "Revue des Études Juives," v. 145). In Padua Abraham delivered philosophical addresses to Christian audiences.

He also compiled a book on Hebrew grammar, in which he attempted to treat philosophically the construction of the Hebrew language and to refute the opinions of the eminent grammarian David Kimhi. In this work Abraham was the first to treat the syntax (which he called in Hebrew harkabah) as a special part of the grammar. The book was published, with a Latin translation and a supplementary treatise on the Hebrew accents, under the title "Miḳneh Abram," by Maestro (Calo) Ḳalonymos ben David, a well-known translator. Grätz ("Gesch. der Juden," ix. 215) suggests, without evidence, that the printer Daniel Bomberg (who is supposed to have learned Hebrew from Balmes) translated this grammar. He also translated, among other works, the Long Commentary on Aristotle's Posterior Analytics into Latin; his edition was printed Venice around 1520.

At his death, honors were paid to his memory by his Christian pupils.

== Further Bibliography ==
- Saverio Campanini, Peculium Abrae. La grammatica ebraico-latina di Avraham de Balmes, in «Annali di Ca’ Foscari» XXXVI, 3, Serie orientale 28 (1997), pp. 5–49.
- Gyula, Wellesz: Abraham de Balmes mint nyelvész, Budapest, 1895
