= USC&GS McArthur (1874) =

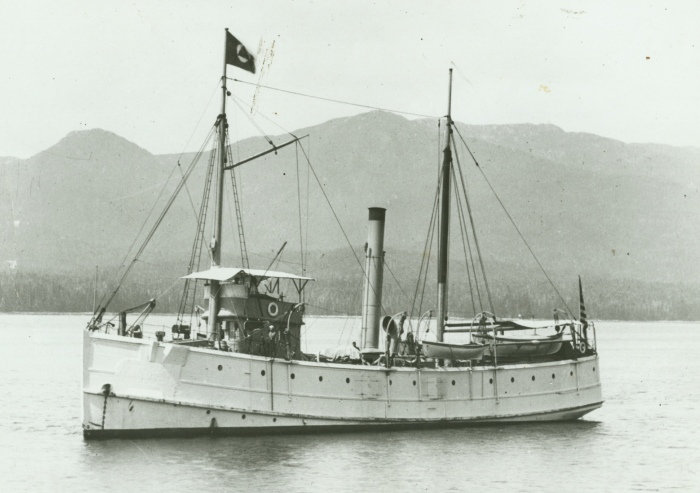
- USC&GS McArthur ca. 1915.

History

United States
- Name: McArthur
- Namesake: William Pope McArthur (1814-1850), a United States Coast Survey officer who pioneered hydrographic survey work on the United States West Coast
- Builder: Mare Island Navy Yard, Vallejo, California
- Completed: 1874
- Commissioned: 1876
- Decommissioned: 1915
- Notes: Served in U.S. Coast Survey 1876-1878 as USCS McArthur and in U.S. Coast and Geodetic Survey 1878-1915 as USC&GS McArthur

General characteristics
- Type: Survey ship
- Length: 121.5 ft (37.0 m)
- Beam: 20 ft (6.1 m)
- Draft: 7 ft (2.1 m)
- Propulsion: Steam engine

The first USC&GS McArthur, originally USCS McArthur, was a steamer that served as a survey ship in the United States Coast Survey from 1876 to 1878 and in the United States Coast and Geodetic Survey from 1878 to 1915.

== Construction and acquisition ==
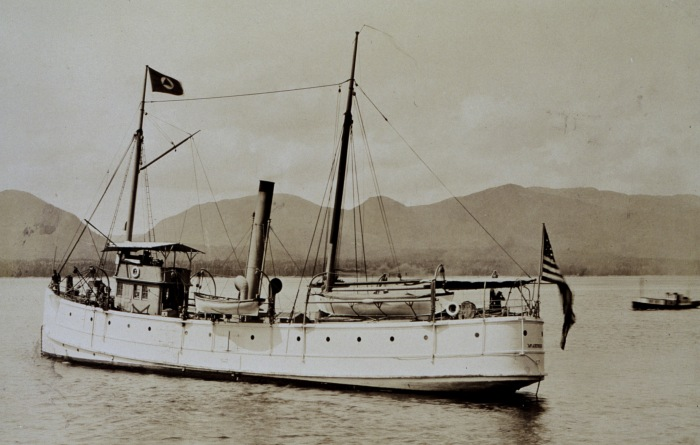
USC&GS McArthur. The United States Coast and Geodetic Survey flag flying from her foremast was first authorized in 1899, indicating this photograph was taken sometime between 1899 and 1915.

McArthur was built by the Mare Island Navy Yard at Vallejo, California, in 1874. She entered Coast Survey service as USCS McArthur in 1876. When the Coast Survey was reorganized in 1878 to form the Coast and Geodetic Survey, she became a part of the new service as USC&GS McArthur.

== Career ==
McArthur served almost exclusively in the waters of the Territory of Alaska.

Tragedy struck McArthur's crew on 17 August 1894 when her commanding officer, Lieutenant Freeman Crosby, US Navy, and four crewmen drowned after their boat capsized coming through surf on the coast of the state of Washington.

On more than one occasion, McArthur assisted mariners in distress. On 15 December 1909, she hauled the passenger steamer Fleetwood off the ground in Grays Harbor, Washington. On 30 May 1914, she rendered assistance to the Ketchikan Power Company barge Blanche; seas were breaking over Blanche, seams had opened in her hull, and water was flooding in faster than Blanche's pumps could pump it out, but McArthur kept Blanche from sinking.

On 16 January 1915, McArthur was at Seattle, Washington when a fire broke out on the docks there. She was unable to move because she did not have steam up. The Coast and Geodetic Survey survey ship USC&GS Explorer, which had steam up, towed both McArthur and the survey ship USC&GS Thomas R. Gedney to a safe location.

McArthur was retired later in 1915.

== Commemoration ==
McArthur Peak, Port McArthur, and McArthur Reef, all in Alaska, were named for McArthur.
