= USS Scandinavia =

Patrol vessel of the United States Navy

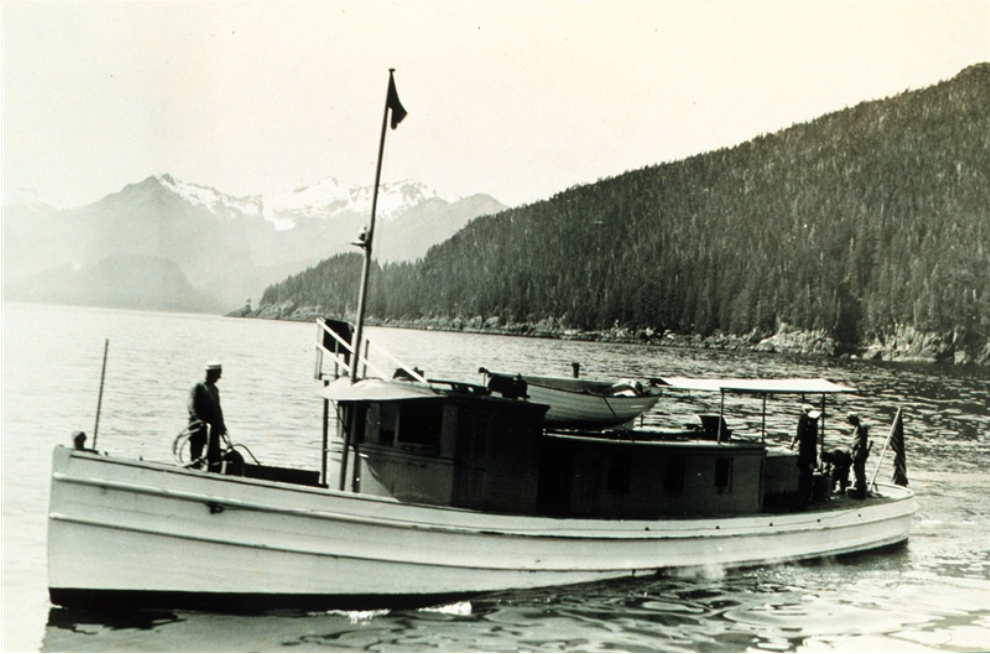
- USC&GS Scandinavia operating in Southeast Alaska in 1927 during her United States Coast and Geodetic Survey service.

History

United States Navy
- Name: USS Scandinavia (SP-3363)
- Namesake: Scandinavia, a region of northern Europe (previous name retained)
- Builder: G. T. Taylor Marine Railway, Norfolk, Virginia
- Completed: 1916
- Acquired: 3 or 5 October 1918
- Commissioned: 5 October 1918
- Decommissioned: 21 May 1919
- Stricken: 21 May 1919
- Fate: Transferred to United States Coast and Geodetic Survey 21 May 1919
- Notes: In use as civilian motorboat Scandinavia 1916–1918

U.S. Coast and Geodetic Survey
- Name: USC&GS Scandinavia
- Namesake: Previous name retained
- Acquired: 21 May 1919

General characteristics (as U.S. Navy vessel)
- Type: Patrol vessel
- Displacement: 26 tons
- Length: 61 ft (19 m)
- Beam: 13 ft 2 in (4.01 m)
- Draft: 5 ft 3 in (1.60 m)
- Propulsion: 2 x 4-cylinder, 45 hp (34 kW) Sterling gasoline engines, 2 x shafts
- Speed: 8.6 or 10 knots (sources disagree)
- Complement: 8

General characteristics (as U.S. Coast and Geodetic Survey vessel)
- Type: Survey launch
- Capacity: Berthing for 3 people

'USS Scandinavia (SP-3363) was a patrol vessel in commission in the United States Navy from 1918 to 1919, seeing service in World War I. After her U.S. Navy service, she was in commission in the United States Coast and Geodetic Survey as the survey launch USC&GS from 1919.

== Construction ==
Scandinavia was built as a civilian motorboat of the same name by the G. T. Taylor Marine Railway at Norfolk, Virginia, in 1916.

== United States Navy service ==
The U.S. Navy acquired Scandinavia from Bie and Schiott of Baltimore, Maryland, on either 3 or 5 October 1918 (sources disagree) for World War I service in the section patrol. The Navy commissioned her on 5 October 1918 as USS Scandinavia (SP-3363).

The Navy assigned Scandinavia to duty with the Naval Overseas Transportation Service district supervisor at Baltimore for service as a dispatch boat and pilot boat. She carried out these duties during the final five and a half weeks of World War I and for a few months in its immediate aftermath. On 21 May 1919, she was decommissioned, stricken from the Navy list, and transferred to the United States Coast and Geodetic Survey.

== United States Coast and Geodetic Survey service ==
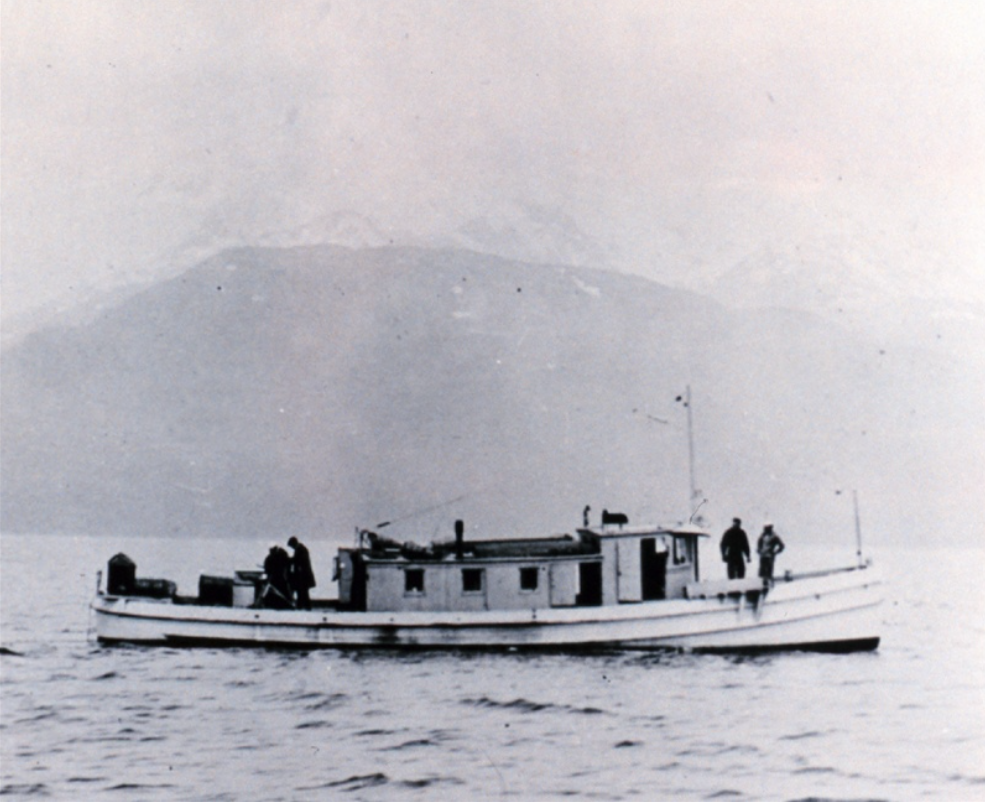
USC&GS Scandinavia participating in hydrographic survey work during her United States Coast and Geodetic Survey service, performing wire-drag operations in the Territory of Alaska in 1920.

The U.S. Coast and Geodetic Survey commissioned the vessel as USC&GS Scandinavia and placed her in service as a survey launch. Photographs of Scandinavia during her Coast and Geodetic Survey career show her performing wire-drag operations in support of hydrographic survey work in the Territory of Alaska in 1920 and operating in Southeast Alaska in 1927.
