= Ramón Alonso R. =

Steamship (1898–1959)

SS Ramón Alonso R.
History
- Name: 1898: Valetta; 1899: Montclair; 1901: José Gallart; 1911: Balmes; 1929: Ramón Alonso R.
- Owner: 1898: African Steamship Company; 1901: A. Folch y Cía; 1905: SA de Nav Transatlántica; 1911: Pinillos, Izquierdo y Cía; 1925: Cía Transoceanica de Nav; 1927: Hijo de Ramón Alonso Ramos SA; 1942: R Ramos Cordero; 1948: Hijo de Ramón Alonso Ramos SA
- Operator: 1898: Elder Dempster Lines; 1938: Nationalist insurgents
- Port of registry: 1899: (United Kingdom) Liverpool; 1901: (Spain) Barcelona; 1911: (Spain) Cádiz; 1925: (Spain) Barcelona
- Builder: Archibald McMillan & Son
- Yard number: 353
- Launched: 22 February 1898
- Completed: 1898
- Identification: 1899: UK official number 109407; 1899: code letters QBWS; 1901: code letters HPTW; by 1913: call sign MYZ; by 1914: call sign ECA; by 1934: call sign EABX
- Fate: Sold for scrap in 1959

General characteristics
- Type: 1898: passenger ship; 1927: cargo ship
- Tonnage: 3,794 GRT, 2,458 NRT
- Length: 370.0 ft (112.8 m)
- Beam: 46.0 ft (14.0 m)
- Depth: 25.8 ft (7.9 m)
- Installed power: 339 NHP
- Propulsion: triple-expansion engine
- Crew: in 1913: 55

Ramón Alonso R. was a merchant steamship that was built in Scotland in 1898 and scrapped in Spain in 1959. Its original name was Montclair. It was renamed José Gallart in 1901, Balmes in 1911 and Ramón Alonso R. in 1929. Its first owner was the British Elder Dempster Lines, but it spent most of its career with a succession of Spanish owners. It was built as a transatlantic ocean liner with some cargo capacity, but in 1927 it was refitted as a cargo ship. In 1913, when it was called Balmes, the ship survived a serious cargo fire in mid-Atlantic.

== Valetta and Montclair ==
Archibald McMillan and Son built the ship at Dumbarton, launching her 22 February 1898 as Valetta for Gow, Harrison and Company. Her registered length was 370.0 ft (112.8 m), her beam was 46.0 ft (14.0 m) and her depth was 25.8 ft (7.9 m). Her tonnages were 3,794 GRT and 2,458 NRT. She had a single screw, driven by a three-cylinder triple-expansion steam engine built by David Rowan and Son of Glasgow, rated at 339 NHP.

Before the ship was completed, Elder, Dempster bought Valetta for its transatlantic service between Britain and Canada. All Elder Dempster ships on that route had names beginning with Mont-, and the ship entered service as Montclair. Elder, Dempster registered Montclair at Liverpool. Her UK official number was 109407 and her UK code letters were QBWS.

== José Gallart and Balmes ==
In 1901 A Folch y Compañía bought Montclair, renamed her José Gallart and registered her in Barcelona. Her Spanish code letters were HPTW. In 1905 ownership passed to the Sociedad Anónima de Navigacion Transatlántica. In 1911 Pinillos, Izquierdo y Companía acquired her, renamed her Balmes and registered her in Cádiz. By 1911 Balmes was equipped for wireless telegraphy. Her transmitter had a range of 500 kilometres (270 nautical miles). By 1913 her call sign was MYZ, but the international reorganisation of call signs in 1914 changed it to ECA.

== Fire at sea ==
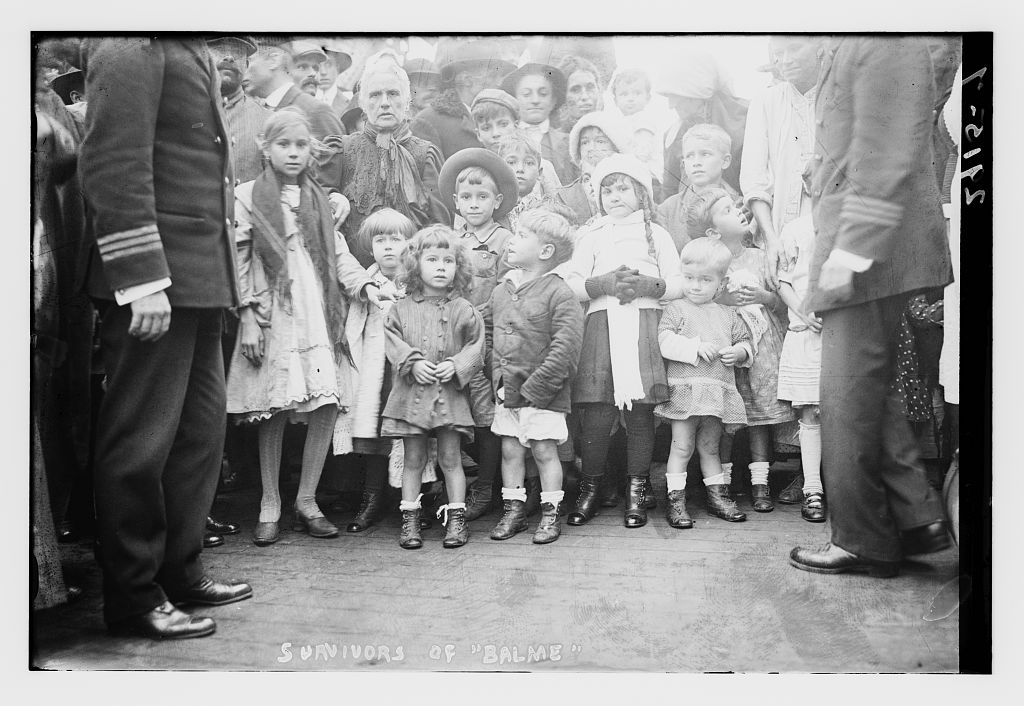
Some of the passengers rescued from the Balmes fire

In November 1913 Balmes left Havana, Cuba carrying 103 passengers and a cargo of sugar, rum and raw cotton. On Thursday 13 November her crew discovered that fire had broken out in the cotton in her number two hold. Her crew fought the fire, and her wireless operator sent a distress signal. The Cunard Liner RMS Pannonia received the signal and changed course to assist.

Pannonia arrived that evening, hove short astern of Balmes, and stood by overnight. At first light on Friday 14 November Pannonia launched four lifeboats, with which she rescued all 103 passengers from Balmes. Captain Juan Ruiz and his 55 crew remained aboard Balmes to continue fighting the fire and try to save their ship. The fire penetrated the timber bulkhead between the cargo hold and the stokehold, but Balmes' engine room crew managed to keep steam up to keep the ship under way.

Two tugs from Bermuda, Gladisfen and Powerful, joined Pannonia to take Balmes in tow. With their assistance, Balmes reached St George's harbour in Bermuda on Sunday 16 November, where the fire was extinguished. Pannonia continued to New York, where she landed Balmes' passengers at Ellis Island.

In 1925, ownership of Balmes passed to the Compañía Transoceanica de Navigacion, who registered her at Barcelona.

== Ramón Alonso R. ==
In 1927, Hijo de Ramón Alonso Ramos acquired Balmes. They had her refitted with her passenger accommodation removed and her cargo capacity increased, and renamed her Ramón Alonso R.. By 1934 her call sign was EABX.

In 1938, during the Spanish Civil War, Nationalist insurgents gained control of the ship and operated her under the names Ramoni and Vietri. After the Civil War, Ramón Alonso R.'s owners regained control of her and she continued in merchant trade. In March 1959 Montajes Erandio scrapped her in Bilbao.
