= USC&GS Cosmos =

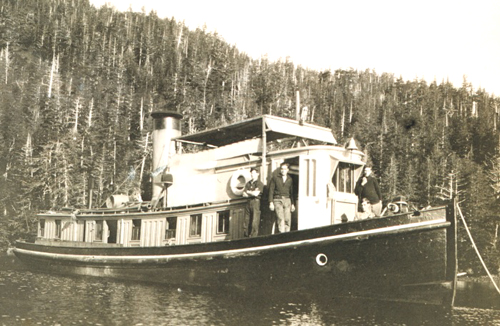
- USC&GS Cosmos

History

United States
- Name: USC&GS Cosmos
- Namesake: Probably the Cosmos Club in Washington, D.C.
- Builder: Mare Island Navy Yard, Vallejo, California
- Cost: $8,073.61 (USD)
- Completed: 1887
- Commissioned: 1887
- Decommissioned: 1927
- Fate: Sold 1927

General characteristics
- Type: Survey ship (launch)
- Length: 52.5 ft (16.0 m)
- Beam: 12 ft (3.7 m)
- Draught: 8 ft (2.4 m)
- Propulsion: Steam engine

USC&GS Cosmos was a survey launch in service in the United States Coast and Geodetic Survey from 1887 to 1927.

Cosmos was built in 1887 by the Mare Island Navy Yard at Vallejo, California. She entered service with the Coast and Geodetic Survey that year. She served along the United States West Coast and in the waters of the Territory of Alaska during her career.

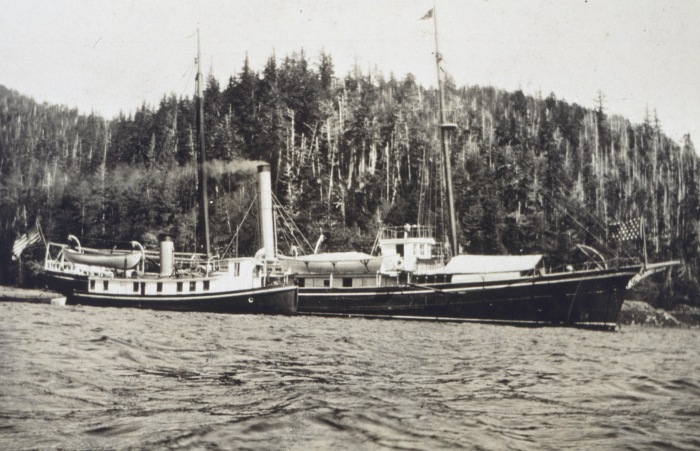
Cosmos in the Territory of Alaska alongside the much larger U.S. Coast and Geodetic Survey survey ship USC&GS Thomas R. Gedney (rear).

On 29–30 April 1913, Cosmos joined the Coast and Geodetic Survey survey ship Thomas R. Gedney and Launch 117 in helping to pull the Pacific Coast Steamship Company ship Curacao off Boulder Spit on Fish Egg Island in Alaska.

Cosmos was retired from service in 1927 and sold for $565 (USD) that year.
