= Harry Parker (rower) =

American rower and rowing coach (1935–2013)

Personal information
- Born: October 28, 1935 Fitchburg, Massachusetts, U.S.
- Died: June 25, 2013 (aged 77) Boston, Massachusetts, U.S.

Sport
- Sport: Rowing
- Club: Vesper BC, Philadelphia
Medal record
Men's rowing
Representing the United States
Pan American Games
Gold medal – first place	1959 Chicago	Single sculls

Harry Lambert Parker (October 28, 1935 – June 25, 2013) was the head coach of the Harvard varsity rowing program (1963–2013). He also represented the United States in the single scull at the 1960 Summer Olympics.

== Rowing career ==
Parker attended the University of Pennsylvania as an undergraduate, where he majored in Philosophy and learned rowing. Mentored by Pennsylvania's coach Joe Burk, Parker rowed on the 1955 Penn Varsity crew that won the Grand Challenge Cup at the Henley Royal Regatta.

After college, Parker began to scull competitively. He won the single sculls at the 1959 Pan American Games. In 1959, Parker also competed in the Diamond Scull event at the Henley Royal Regatta finishing second to six-time champion Stuart Mackenzie.

In 1960, he won the U.S. Olympic trials in the single scull. At the 1960 Summer Olympics in Rome, Parker made the finals and finished fifth.

== Coaching career ==
During his training for the national team, Parker's name was forwarded to the athletic director at Harvard, Thomas Bolles, who appointed Parker freshman coach in 1961. When Harvard's varsity coach Harvey Love died suddenly in the spring of 1963, Parker was promoted to the varsity level on an interim basis. The crew had an uneven spring, and performed poorly at the Eastern Sprints (the league championship for the EARC). The annual highpoint of the Harvard rowing season is the Harvard-Yale race (the oldest and longest-running intercollegiate sporting event in the United States) held in June. Parker meticulously prepared his crew for their biggest race of the year. Heavy underdogs against the favored Yale crew, the Harvard varsity pulled off an upset. Parker was appointed permanent coach of the varsity crew. Harvard would not lose to Yale until 1981.

Parker's success was immediate and unprecedented. His crews won the Eastern Sprints every year between 1964 and 1970. Parker coached a Harvard four man boat (4+) at the 1964 Summer Olympics in Tokyo. Parker and the Harvard crew made the cover of Sports Illustrated in 1965. Parker's crews won the 1967 Pan American Games, and finished second at the 1967 European Championships. Parker's 1968 crew earned the right to represent the United States at the 1968 Summer Olympics in Mexico City—the last collegiate crew ever to do so. The Harvard 8 narrowly won the Olympic trials by 5/100th of a second over of a powerful University of Pennsylvania crew – a race that pitted Parker against his mentor Joe Burk.

In Mexico, one of Harvard's rowers became ill and had to be replaced. Harvard made the finals and finished sixth. Several members of the crew were involved in the political turmoil which swept over the games.

Harvard was the last non-national team crew to represent the United States in the Olympics in the 8+ man event. Until 1960, the United States, using a trial system where the best 8 man crew went to the Olympics, had won every gold medal. But the rest of the world had caught up and was surpassing the USA. In particular, Karl Adam and his Ratzeburg crews from West Germany had become the team to beat. (Parker was one of the first US coaches to adopt Adam's methods). In 1972, the NAAO, the then governing organization for rowing in the United States, put together a national camp system to help ensure that the best rowers were in the national boat. Parker was named head coach. With Parker at the helm and with numerous former Harvard oarsmen in the boat, Team USA finished second to New Zealand earning a silver medal in the 8+ at the 1972 Summer Olympics in Munich. In the 1970s, Parker's Harvard crews continued to be successful. They did not win the Sprints in the years 1971–1973, but the losses were close. Then came the 1974 and 1975 Harvard varsities which are considered to be among the greatest in the history of the sport. They swept the collegiate competition, including dual races each year against the undefeated west coast champions Washington. Numerous team members went on to row for the national team. Post-season, the 1975 crew went to England to race at the Henley Royal Regatta. They finished second in the premier event of the regatta, the Grand Challenge Cup, losing to the British national team by two lengths.

Parker was also a path-breaking coach: he was the first women's national team coach in 1975. That eight went on to win a silver medal at the World Rowing Championships (the so-called Red Rose Crew). Parker would go on to coach the USA women's eight (8+) at the 1976 Summer Olympics in Montreal where they earned a bronze medal.

Parker's crews continued to be formidable in the mid and late 1970s, winning the Eastern Sprints in 1975, 1976, 1977 and 1980. But Yale was on the rise; it won the Eastern Sprints in 1978 and 1979 and beat Harvard in doing so. Still, Harvard continued to win the Harvard-Yale race. Parker ran his streak to 18 years. Finally, in 1981, Yale ended the streak and would go on to win the next three races.

In 1983, Harvard won the Eastern Sprints, and in one of the best collegiate races ever, snatched the inaugural National Collegiate Rowing Championship by coming from a length down with 500 meters to go and catching a super-fast Washington boat at the line. Parker's 1985 Harvard varsity – after some early-season losses – won the Eastern Sprints, the National Collegiate Rowing Championship and the Grand Challenge Cup at the Henley Royal Regatta.

Through the late 1980s and early 1990s, Harvard continued to be a dominating presence in rowing. Parker's crews won the national championship in 1983, 1985, 1987, 1988, 1989, and 1992, and they were Eastern Sprints champions in 1988, 1989, and 1990.

The national championship race was disbanded in 1996, following which the Intercollegiate Rowing Association Championship, also known as the IRA, became the de facto national championship. Harvard had never gone to the IRAs during Parker's tenure, but in 2003, after a decade of good showings but no championships, Parker's varsity won the Eastern Sprints and decided to go to the IRA, which they also won. They continued the streak by winning both the Eastern Sprints and the IRAs in 2004 and 2005.

The 2004 crew may have been Harvard's fastest crew ever. National team crews are older and more experienced than college oarsmen, and are far better prepared than when Harvard raced in the 1968 Summer Olympics. Following the 2004 season, the Harvard varsity went to Europe, where it rowed in the World Cup in Lucerne which was a tune-up for most of the national teams competing in the Olympics. In an upset, Harvard made the finals at Lucerne by defeating the British and French Olympic squads. Harvard lost to the five national teams in the finals at Lucerne, which included four of the top six finishers at the Olympic games—but they were competitive for the length of the course. Harvard then competed in the Grand Challenge Cup at Henley, losing in the finals to the Dutch Olympic 8+, which was also an Olympic finalist.

Harry coached many entrances in the Henley Royal Regatta. His last attendance of the regatta, in 2012, saw his Varsity win by a foot over Leander in the Ladies' Plate. In 2013, two weeks after Harry's death, four members of his final varsity, coached by Bill Manning, broke the record in the Visitor's Challenge Cup.

Parker has nine official (or quasi-official) national championships, which is the second most among active coaches. Parker's crews from the 1960s and 1970s won several unofficial titles.

He completed 51 seasons at the helm, having confirmed his place as the most significant American coach of the latter half of the 20th century.

== Harry Parker Boathouse ==
On September 10, 2008, Community Rowing, Inc. announced that it would name its new boathouse after Harry Parker. The boathouse is located in Brighton, MA. According to the press release,

Community Rowing, Inc. (CRI), the largest public rowing organization in the United States, announced today that it will name its new $15 million boathouse after Harry Parker, Harvard University's men's varsity rowing coach. Mr. Parker, who is a resident of Winchester, MA is a Trustee of Community Rowing and longstanding supporter of efforts to bring the sport to a broader and more diverse audience. The official boathouse dedication will be held on Thursday, October 16, 2008 at 5:00pm.

== Personal life ==
Parker's first marriage, in 1959, with Elinor Goodman, whom he met at the University of Pennsylvania, produced two sons. It ended with their divorce in 1979. George Franklin Parker and David Lambert Parker were born during the 1960s. He later married Kathy Keeler, the stroke of the gold medal-winning USA Women's 8+ at the 1984 Olympic Games in Los Angeles. They had a daughter named Abigail Parker.

In 2011, Parker was diagnosed with myelodysplastic syndrome. Former Freshmen coach Bill Manning was promoted to Associate Head Coach when Parker began treatment. Parker died in Boston, Massachusetts at the age of 77 on June 25, 2013.

== Achievements ==
=== Personal ===
- US Representative and Gold Medal winner in the single scull (1x) at the 1959 Pan American Games
- US Representative and 5th Place Finisher in the single scull (1x) at the 1960 Olympic Games
- Member US Rowing Hall of Fame as a coach (elected 1974)
- Oarsman on the 1955 Penn Varsity Boat elected to the US Rowing Hall of Fame in 1977

=== Harvard's crew ===
- San Diego Crew Classic (Varsity): 1975, 1976, 1979, 1987, 1991, 1992, 1994, 2012
- Varsity Eastern Sprints championships (First Varsity): 1964, 1965, 1966, 1967, 1968, 1969, 1970, 1974, 1975, 1976, 1977, 1980, 1983, 1985, 1988, 1989, 1990, 2003, 2004, 2005, 2007, 2010, 2011, 2013
- National Championships: (unofficial: undefeated and a boat they beat won the IRA) 1965, 1966, 1967, 1968, 1974, 1975, 1976; (quasi-official—National Collegiate Rowing Championship) 1983, 1985, 1987, 1988, 1989, 1992: (quasi-official—IRA) 2003, 2004, 2005
- Henley Royal Regatta: 1973 (Ladies' Challenge Plate: Second Varsity); 1985 (Grand Challenge Cup); 1990 (Ladies Challenge Plate); 1993 (Britannia Challenge Cup); 1998 (Ladies Challenge Plate); 2002 (Ladies Challenge Plate; Britannia Challenge Cup); 2007 (Ladies Challenge Plate); 2010 (Ladies Challenge Plate); 2011 (Prince Albert Challenge Cup); 2012 (Ladies Challenge Plate)
- Harvard-Yale Race (record as coach: (43–7): Every year since 1963, except for 1981–1984; 1996; 1999; 2007)

=== Olympic coach ===
- 1964—Men's Four with Coxswain (Did not qualify)
- 1968—Men's Eight (6th Place)
- 1972—Men's Eight (Silver Medal)
- 1976—Women's Eight (Bronze Medal)
- 1980—Men's Head coach (USA boycotted games)
- 1984—Men's Double (Gold Medal)

== See also ==
- Andrew Sudduth
