= Marist Red Foxes =

- University: Marist University
- Nickname: Red Foxes
- NCAA: Division I (FCS)
- Conference: Metro Conference (primary); Pioneer Football League
- Athletic director: Tim Murray
- Location: Poughkeepsie, New York, United States
- Varsity teams: 23
- Football stadium: Tenney Stadium
- Basketball arena: McCann Arena
- Baseball stadium: James J. McCann Baseball Field
- Other venues: Gartland Athletic Field; Tennis Pavilion; Longview Park
- Colors: Red and white
- Mascot: Frankie
- Fight song: Marist Fight Song
- Website: goredfoxes.com

The Red Foxes are the athletic teams of Marist University. The Marist Red Foxes compete in NCAA Division I athletics as a member of the Metro Conference (known before July 2026 as the Metro Atlantic Athletic Conference, or MAAC), the only exception being football, a member of the Pioneer Football League (PFL).

The Red Foxes make up 23 varsity teams. Separate men's and women's teams are sponsored for basketball, tennis, crew, lacrosse, soccer, cross country, track, swimming and diving. Sponsored women's teams are softball, volleyball, and water polo. While sponsored men's teams are baseball and football. These varsity programs involve more than 550 Marist student-athletes. The crew programs are among the few in the nation that claim on-campus facilities.

The red fox or reynard is indigenous to the Hudson Valley where Marist is located and is regarded as highly intelligent and cunning. It is the red fox from which Marist's school colors of red and white are derived.

Marist has been recognized by Sports Illustrated as having one of the top 200 college athletic programs in the U.S.

== Overview ==
The Marist athletic department is the biggest and most successful in the MAAC. Marist has been awarded the MAAC conference's highest honor, the Commissioner's Cup, more than any school in history. The Commissioner's Cup is given annually to the most successful MAAC athletic department over the course of the year.

Student athletes at Marist routinely excel in the classroom. In 2019 for the 18th straight year Marist led the MAAC with 262 selections to the conference's Academic Honor Roll. Marist also had 57 student athletes selected to the PFL's Academic Honor Roll and four men's rowers named to the Intercollegiate Rowing Association (IRA) 2019 All-Academic Team.

In 2017, in the wake of mass shootings across the United States, Marist changed its mascot's name from "Shooter" to "Frankie".

== Sports sponsored ==
Men's sports	Women's sports
Baseball	Basketball
Basketball	Cross country
Cross country	Lacrosse
Football	Rowing
Lacrosse	Soccer
Rowing	Softball
Soccer	Swimming and diving
Swimming and diving	Tennis
Tennis	Track and field^{†}
Track and field^{†}	Volleyball
	Water polo
† – Track and field includes both indoor and outdoor.

=== Men's basketball ===
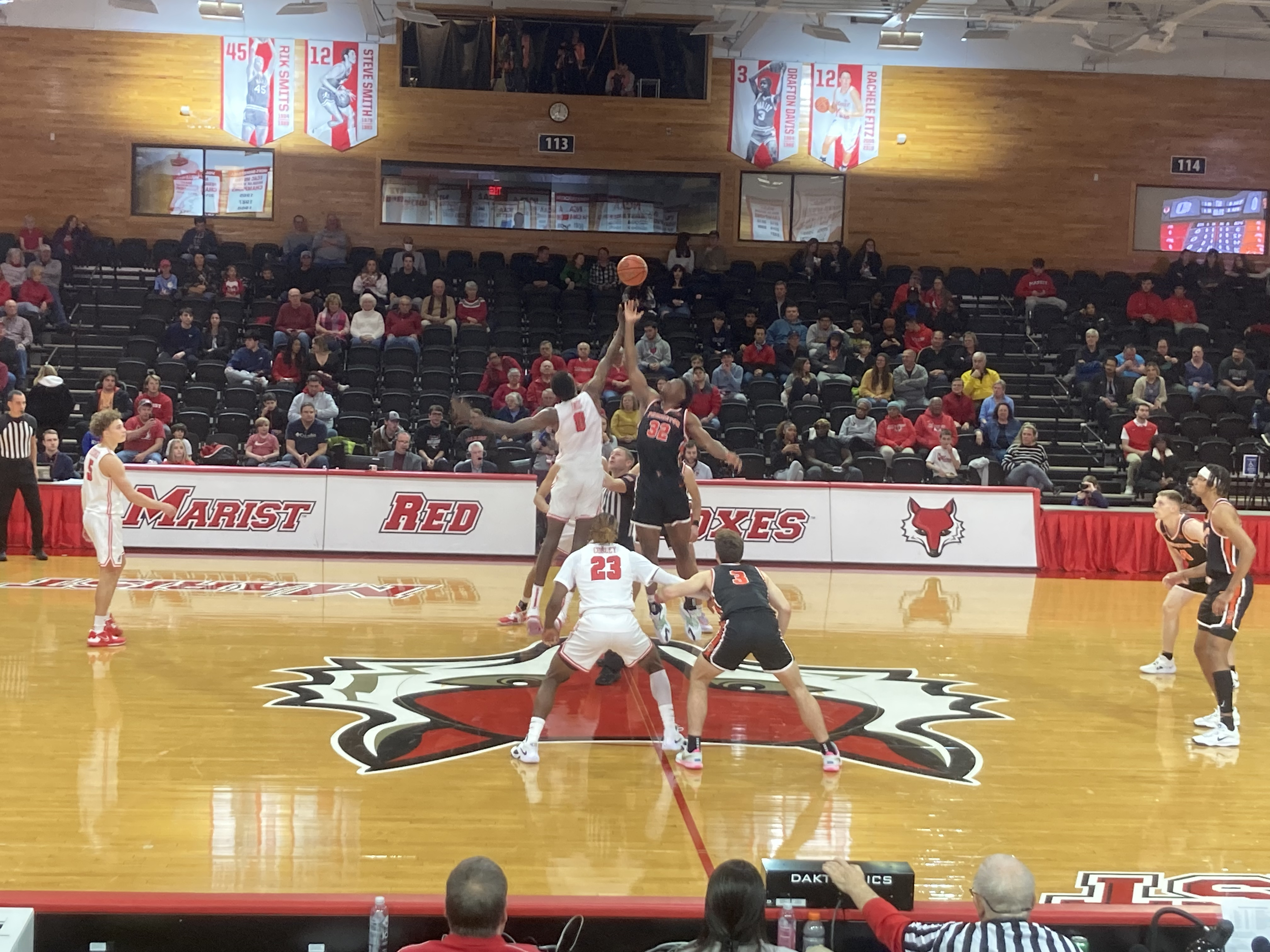
Marist men's basketball vs Princeton University

The Marist men's basketball team's first varsity season was 1961–62 at the NCAA Division III level. For 20 years Marist would play at this level. Their most successful season during this time was the 1970–71 season under head coach Ron Petro, in which they went 21–7. The Marist Athletic Department including the men's basketball program transitioned up to the Division I level before the 1981–82 season. In response to the competitive landscape the program encountered in Division I for basketball recruits Marist became one of the first college programs to recruit players from overseas. This strategy worked and Marist was able to attract very talented international players to Poughkeepsie. At the time, Pecarski was considered by some to be Europe's top 17-year-old player, but he was injured in the preseason, creating an opportunity for Smits.

The Red Foxes have qualified for the NCAA tournament twice (1986, 1987), losing in the first round in both instances. Prior to joining the MAAC in 1997, Marist was a charter member of the ECAC Metro Conference in 1981; which became the Northeast Conference in 1988.

=== Women's basketball ===
The Marist women's basketball team won 20 games for the first time during the 1981–1982 season going 21–10 under head coach Susan Deer. They would not reach the 20 win plateau again until the hiring of Brian Giorgis before the 2002–2003 season. In Brian's first season Marist would go 20–11, (13–5 MAAC). Since then, under Brian's guidance, Marist has dominated the MAAC with 10 championships and has become a powerhouse on the national stage.

The first conference crown came in 2004 followed by another one in 2006. Although Marist would lose both times in the first round of the NCAA tournament (2004 to Oklahoma and 2006 to Georgia) these games were just building blocks for greater successes.

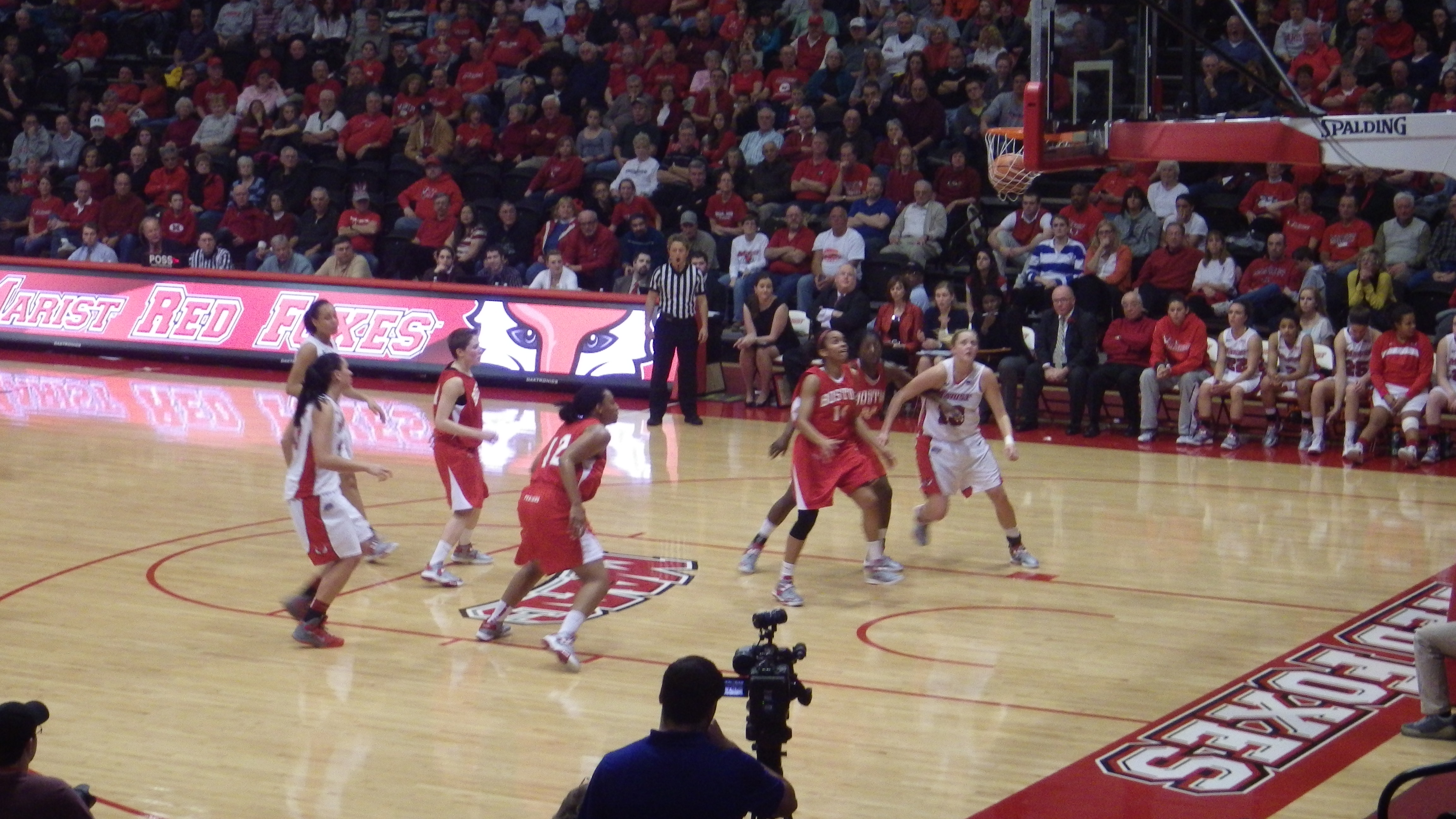
Marist women's basketball game vs Boston University at McCann Arena

In March 2007, after a going 27–5 and making the NCAA tournament for the third time in school history, Marist's women's basketball team surprised a nation of NCAA fans under the leadership of co-captains Alisa Kresge and Nikki Flores, carried by Rachele Fitz. They became the third 13th seed to make it to the Sweet 16 since the women's tournament expanded to 64 teams. They defeated 4th-seeded Ohio State and 5th-seeded Middle Tennessee to make it to the Sweet 16.

In March 2008, the women's basketball team was seeded 7th in the New Orleans Regional of the NCAA basketball tournament where they defeated the 10th seeded DePaul Blue Demons 76–57. They were then defeated by the 2nd seeded LSU Lady Tigers 68–49 on March 24, 2008, ending Marist's 22-game winning streak.

The 2009 and 2010 Women's NCAA basketball tournaments saw Marist lose in the first rounds to Virginia and Georgetown respectively.

In the 2011 NCAA tournament the women's basketball team defeated Iowa State in the first round and were thoroughly defeating Duke at Cameron Indoor Stadium in the 2nd round until Marist's best player Erica Allenspach was injured. Duke took the lead late in the 2nd half and prevailed 71–66.

During the 2011–12 season the Marist women's basketball team won their seventh straight MAAC championship by crushing Fairfield in the MAAC Final 61–35. They would go on to the NCAA Tournament as a 13 seed and beat 4th seed Georgia 76–70. Marist would then lose a tough game in the second round 66–63 to the 5th seed St. Bonaventure ending another successful season for a team that was viewed as Marist's most vulnerable in years.

The 2012–2013 season was the third time in six years that Marist would go undefeated in MAAC regular season play (18–0). Marist cruised through the MAAC tournament and defeated Iona 72–48 in the championship game. This was Marist's 9th MAAC title tying Saint Peter's for the most championships in MAAC history.

Shortly after winning the 2013 MAAC crown Brian Giorgis was named an assistant coach for the USA Women's World University Games Team during the 2013 games to be held in Kazan, Russia.

In the first round of the 2013 NCAA Tournament Marist struggled offensively and lost a tough first-round game to Michigan State 55–47.

Marist extended its MAAC dominance during the 2013–14 season winning their 10th overall MAAC crown and 9th straight after overcoming a 17-point deficit against Quinnipiac University in the conference tournament championship game to win 70–66. The game was Marist's 26th MAAC tournament win in a row.

Marist was defeated 87–65 by its hosts, a red hot shooting Iowa Hawkeyes team who shot 12 of 25 from 3-point range and 57 percent from the field, in the first round of the 2014 NCAA Division I women's basketball tournament.

Second seeded Marist lost to #1 seed Quinnipiac in the 2015 MAAC Tournament Championship Game ending the Red Foxes' nine-year run as champions and 28 game winning streak in conference tournament games. This was also the first time in 35 MAAC tournament games that Marist wasn't the higher seeded team.

=== Crew ===
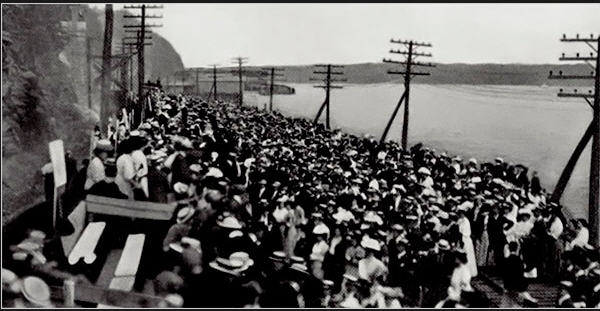
Spectators at the 1907 Poughkeepsie Regatta

Marist has a large and active rowing program. Marist currently hosts both men's and women's heavyweight and lightweight teams. The women's teams compete as part of the MAAC. The teams row out of the Marist Boathouse on campus and use Longview Park to host races.

Each spring Marist competes against the United States Military Academy for the President's Cup Trophy. The two teams switch off hosting the event each year. West Point's proximity (30 miles south, on the opposite shore of the Hudson) and its competitive rowers (despite its club team status) has led to an intense rivalry developing over the years. The President's Cup Regatta, named in honor of former Marist College President Linus Richard Foy has been an annual event for over four decades.

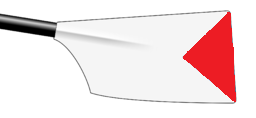
Marist College Crew rowing blade

In October 2009, to celebrate the quadricentennial of Henry Hudson's exploration of the Hudson River, Marist hosted a reenactment of the Intercollegiate Rowing Association's now defunct Poughkeepsie Regatta at Longview Park. From 1895 to 1949 the IRA's national championship race was held in Poughkeepsie on the same site that is now Longview Park. The original races started off Rogers Point in Hyde Park and ended about a mile south of the Poughkeepsie-Highland Railroad Bridge. The top college teams would attend and Poughkeepsie was known as the rowing capital of the world. There were about 125,000 fans along the route in 1929, and 100,000 in 1930. 2009 competitors included Marist, Columbia, Cornell, Navy, Pennsylvania, Syracuse, Army, and Vassar College. Since 2009 Marist's autumn Poughkeepsie Regatta has been held intermittently.

Marist routinely participates in the annual ECAC championships, the NYSCCA (New York State) rowing championships and the IRA national championships.

During the summer of 2002 the Marist men's varsity eight boat advanced to the semifinals of the Temple Challenge Cup at the Henley Royal Regatta.

In 2013 the women's program qualified for the inaugural NCAA Rowing Championships in Indianapolis.

=== Football ===
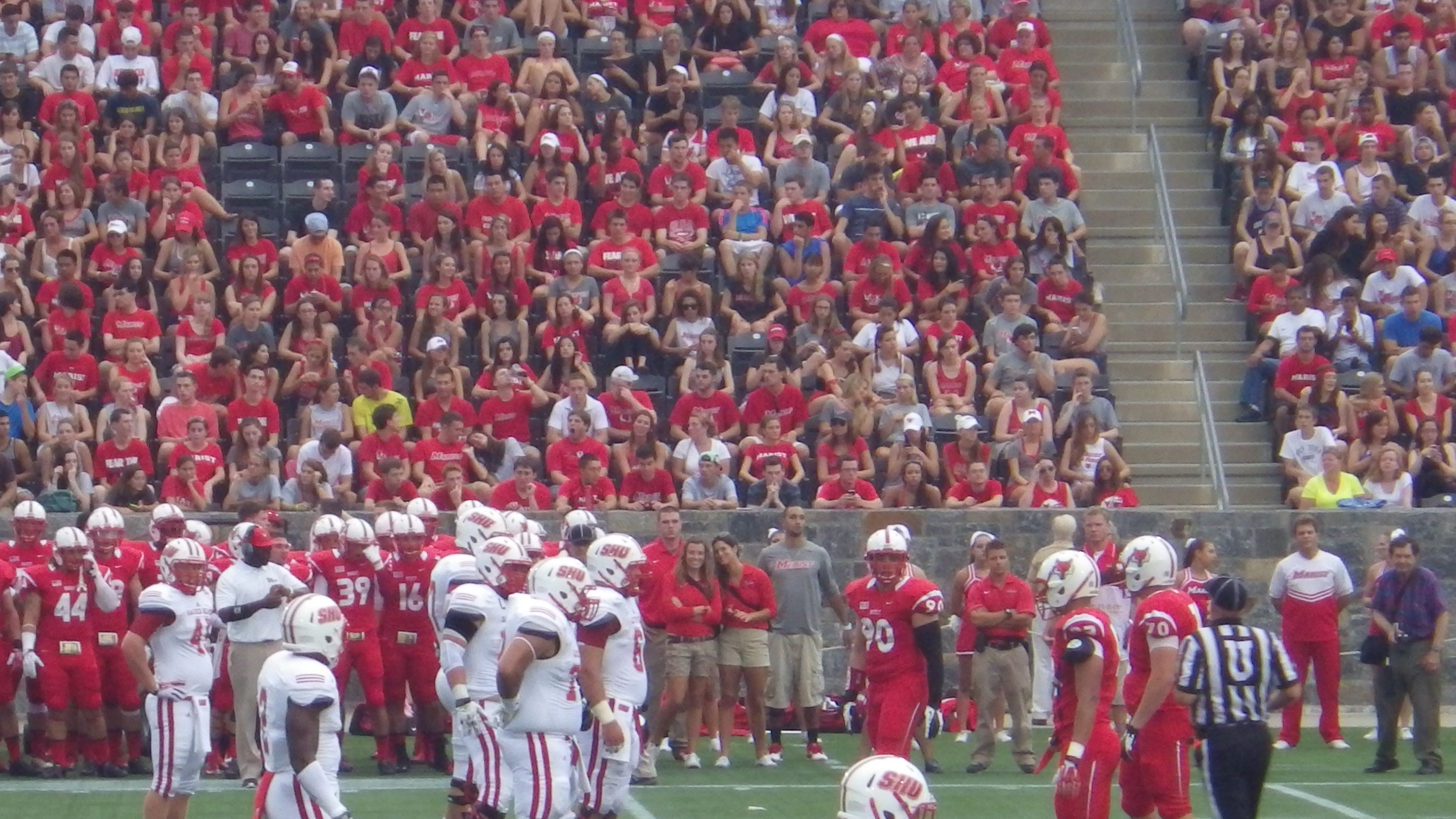
Marist vs Sacred Heart in 2013

Football started at Marist as a club sport in 1965 and became a varsity sport in 1978 as a Division III independent. In 1993 football moved up to Division I-AA and in 1994 became the first Marist athletic team to become a member of the Metro Atlantic Athletic Conference. Marist plays its home games in Tenney Stadium on the main campus in Poughkeepsie.

In February 2008, Marist joined the Pioneer Football League as its tenth member effective for the 2009 season, ending the MAAC Football League.

There is one former member of the Red Foxes currently playing in the National Football League: Jason Myers. Terrence Fede is the only Red Fox to have been selected in the NFL Draft.

=== Lacrosse ===
The men's lacrosse team has been to three NCAA Tournaments after winning the MAAC lacrosse title in 2005, 2015, and 2026. In 2005 they would go on to play eventual national champion Johns Hopkins in the first round. Marist was soundly defeated 22–6. In the 2015 tournament #20 Marist bested Bryant University 10–6 in a first four game. However #2 ranked Syracuse had too much talent for the foxes in their first-round game winning 20–8.

Originating as a club sport during the 1970s, men's lacrosse subsequently became an NCAA Division III varsity sport and by the early 1980s, began transitioning up to Division I. In 1981, the Marist men's lacrosse team captured the Knickerbocker Conference title.

The women's team has been to two NCAA Tournaments. Losing both times in the first round to Colgate (2008) and Maryland (2010).

=== Soccer ===
The men's soccer program has qualified for three NCAA tournaments (2000, 2004 & 2005) and the women's program once (2011).

The 2004 men's team lost a tough first-round game in overtime 2–1 to the University of Connecticut.

In 2005, the men's team suffered another tough first round loss to St. John's University, 3–1.

=== Softball ===
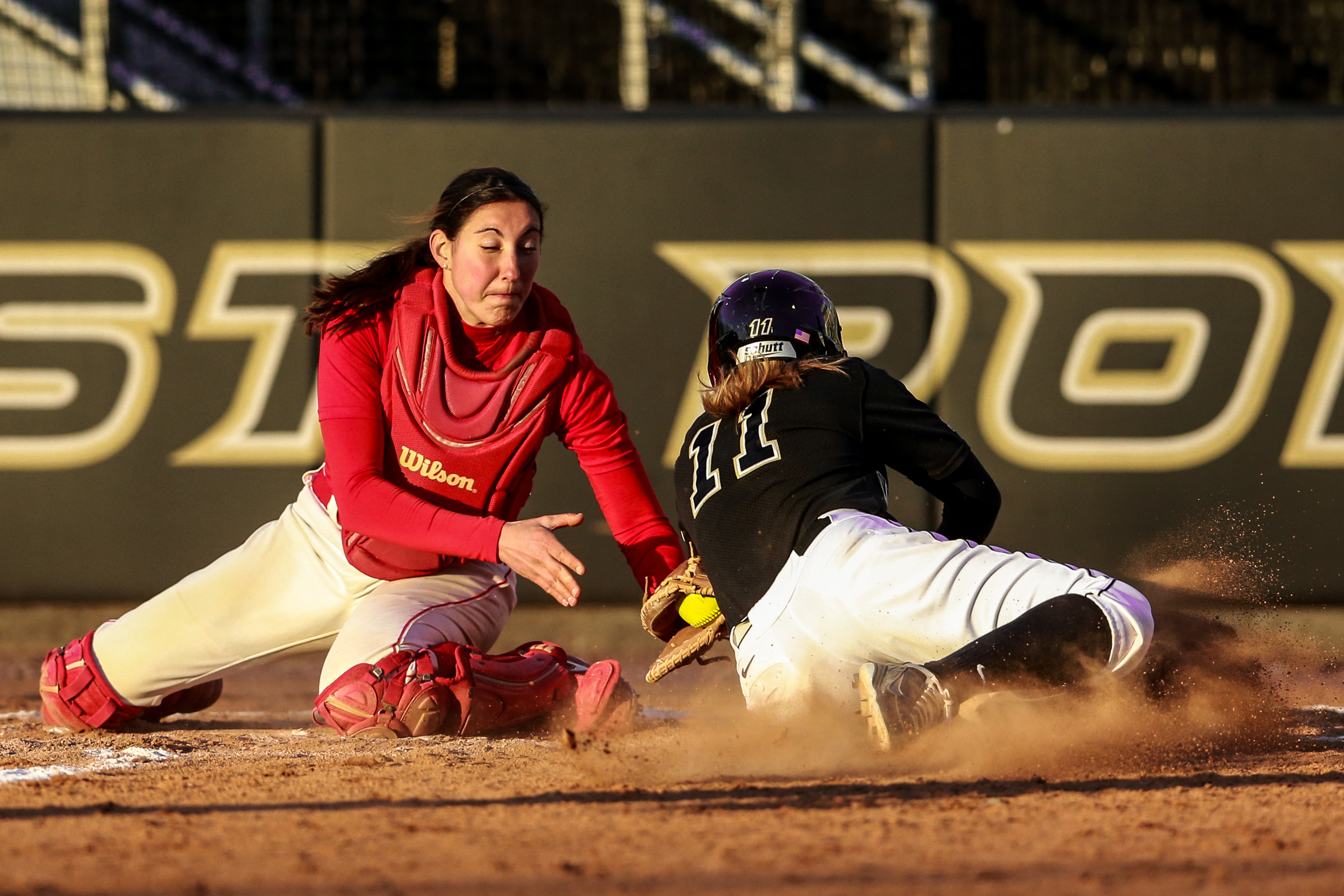
A game between Marist and Army in 2013

Marist has won three MAAC championships, all of which advanced them to the NCAA Division I Softball Championship (2006, 2013, & 2016). They have also won the NEC Tournament championship in 1996, which advanced them to the play-in round of the 1996 NCAA Division I softball tournament

=== Tennis ===
The Marist men's team is a successful program in the conference having advanced to play in 11 Division I NCAA Men's Tennis Championships. The team has mostly finished near the top of the conference standings, even in years when they did not win the championship.

The women's team also has been moderately successful having advanced to 4 Division I NCAA Women's Tennis Championships.

=== Swimming and diving ===
The Marist men's and women's programs are the most successful programs in MAAC history.

The men have won 12 MAAC titles (1996, 1997, 1998, 1999, 2000, 2001, 2002, 2003, 2005, 2006, 2007, 2008 and 2024).

The women have won 18 MAAC titles (1997, 1998, 1999, 2000, 2002, 2004, 2005, 2006, 2007, 2008, 2010, 2011, 2012, 2013, 2014, 2015, 2016 and 2017).

In addition the men have won two Metropolitan team championships (1990, 1995) and the women two (1994, 1995). The women have also won two ECAC championships (1994, 1995). Marist has had 3 ECAC athletes of the year, Brian Bolstad in 2010, Devin O'Nalty in 2008 and Jamie Falco in 2007.

=== Water polo ===
The Marist athletic department added women's water polo in 2000. They started competing in the MAAC after the league began sponsoring the sport In 2003. Since then the team has been nationally ranked on several occasions and has won 4 MAAC titles (2006, 2008, 2009 & 2010) each of which earned them an automatic berth to the NCAA Women's Water Polo Championship Tournament.

== Rivalries ==
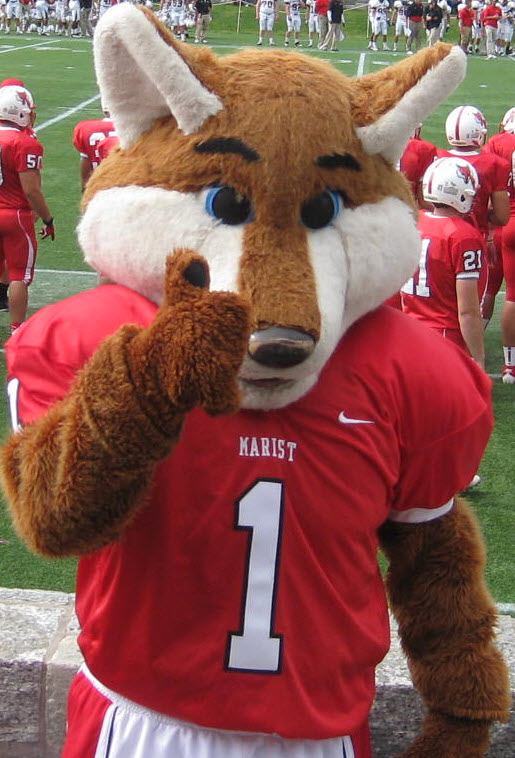
Frankie the red fox posing at Tenney Stadium on the Marist College campus

- Baseball – Manhattan College, United States Military Academy, Siena College
- Men's basketball – Siena College, Iona University
- Women's basketball – Fairfield University, Iona University, Siena College, Quinnipiac University, Ohio State University
- Football – University of New Haven, University of San Diego, Georgetown University, Bucknell University
- Men's lacrosse - Siena College
- Women's lacrosse - Siena College
- Men's rowing – United States Military Academy, Trinity College, Hartford, Hobart College, Ithaca College, University of Delaware, Jacksonville University
- Women's rowing - Jacksonville University
- Softball – Canisius College
- Track – Manhattan College, Iona University
- Men's Soccer - Fairfield University
- Women's soccer – Siena College
- Swimming – Rider University
- Men's tennis – Fairfield University
- Women's tennis – Fairfield University

=== Battle of I-87 ===
Siena College located in Albany, New York is Marist's fiercest rival, most notably in men's basketball. Many fans and sportswriters refer to this match-up as "The Battle of I-87" because of the two-hour proximity of each school on Interstate 87 (Coincidentally, the approximate distance between the two is 87.4 miles). Although this rivalry exists in all sports, it is most heated during the basketball season. During the 1983–1984 season a brawl between the two basketball teams, their fans and coaches at McCann put the series on hiatus for three years. The animosity goes back to when both schools competed at the Division II level, then the ECAC Metro Conference and continues today in the MAAC.

== Facilities ==
=== James J. McCann Recreation Center ===
The James J. McCann Recreation Center consists of three major areas and dozens of minor ones. The three major areas are the McCann Field House, the Natatorium, and the Strength and Conditioning Center.

McCann Arena is a 3,200-seat multi-purpose arena home to the men's and women's basketball and women's volleyball teams. It also hosts special events such as concerts for the student population.

The natatorium is a 265,000 US gallons (1,000 m^{3}) facility, ranging in depth from 4 feet (1.2 m) to 13 feet (4.0 m). It provides six 25-yard (23 m) lanes and an independent diving well. The well contains two 1-meter and one 3-meter diving board.

The Strength and Conditioning Center is two floors. The lower floor consists of weight training equipment, the upper floor consists of cardiovascular training equipment. All told, the facility can easily accommodate 100 students simultaneously.

Minor areas include two racquetball courts, a 2,200-square-foot (200 m^{2}) dance studio, five locker rooms, a classroom, the Pepsi Hall of Fame multi-media meeting room, the 2,100-square-foot (200 m^{2}) Dr. Maynard Center for Sports Medicine, the Academic Enhancement Center, the 4,200-square-foot (390 m^{2}) Coach's Complex, an 11,000-square-foot (1,000 m^{2}) Mondo-surfaced auxiliary gymnasium, used heavily by intramurals and club sports, and a student lounge.

=== Tennis pavilion ===
In 2006, a tennis pavilion opened to support the men's and women's tennis programs. It features eight lighted, regulation-sized courts, a center walkway, and a pergola-covered spectator area. Along with Marist the United States Military Academy and the USTA Billie Jean King National Tennis Center in Queens, New York, host site of the U.S. Open, are the only tennis venues in the area that can boast a Deco II playing surface. Designed by Skidmore, Owings and Merrill the pavilion is located on the east campus. The pavilion replaced the old tennis courts that were removed in 1994 to make room for the construction of the Murray Student Center.

=== Boathouse Row and Longview Park ===
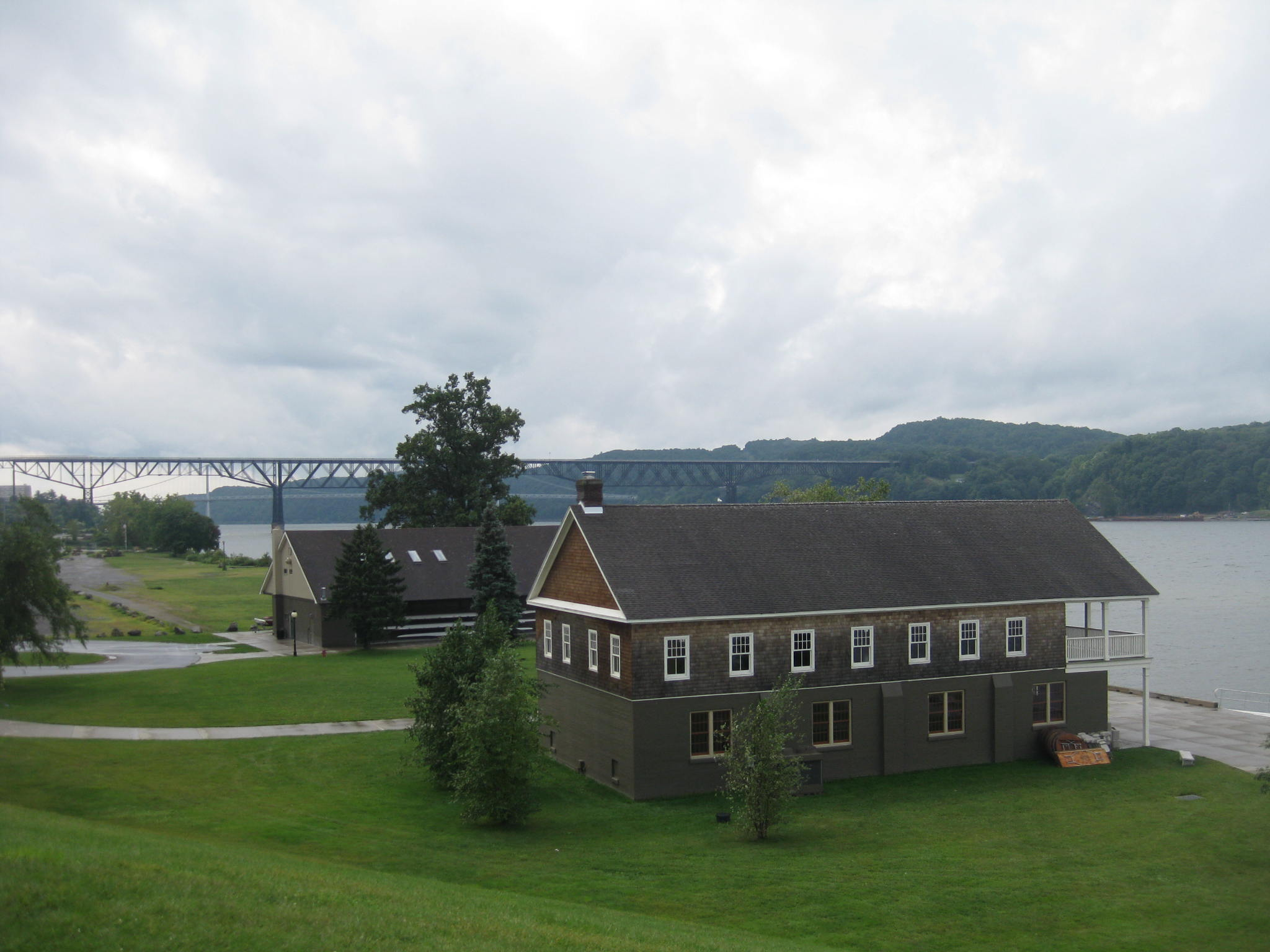
Cornell (foreground) and Marist boathouses with Poughkeepsie Bridge in distance

The athletic facilities with the greatest amount of history in the Marist College Athletic Department are the boathouses located on campus, which sit on the banks of the Hudson River. It is rare in collegiate rowing to have on-campus rowing facilities. Two houses exist: the original Cornell University boathouse once occupied by Cornell's crew teams during their annual training and racing at the Poughkeepsie Regatta, which was held in Poughkeepsie from the late 19th century until 1949, and the newer adjacent Marist boathouse, which stands on the former site of the University of California and University of Washington boathouses. The Marist boathouse features a boat bay, which contains a fleet of 16 top-of-the-line Vespoli shells. Additionally, on the second floor are 30 Concept II ergs, free weights, a video viewing lounge and a coaching office. The Cornell boathouse was remodeled in 2008, and currently is used by the school President for administrative functions, as well as housing a few racing shells for the women's team.

The 12 acre Longview Park is home of the champion Marist men's and women's rowing teams. It is where Marist hosts intercollegiate and interscholastic rowing regattas. It has a bike/walk path along the Hudson River's east shore, a fishing pier, the boathouses, and a gazebo with scenic vistas on a promontory in the center of the park.

=== Gartland Athletic Field & Softball Field ===
Also known as North Field, the Gartland Athletic Field now serves as a core practice facility for Marist intercollegiate sports, including soccer, lacrosse, and rugby. It is also a playing field for club sports and general recreation. At almost 10 acres (40,000 m^{2}) in size, the field is large enough to accommodate three team practices simultaneously. The turf is composed of a Kentucky bluegrass, rye and fescue mix situated on a sand and organic material base. An irrigation system provides 85 sprinkler heads to help maintain this practice location.

The intercollegiate Softball field, equipped with a state-of-the-art electronic score board and newly renovated dugouts, resides in the far corner of North field. A practice softball field at the opposite end of the field is used during tournament play, intramural games, and sole club sports.

== See also ==
- List of college athletic programs in New York
