= Columbia Lions =

Athletic teams of Columbia University

- University: Columbia University
- Nickname: Lions
- NCAA: Division I (FCS)
- Conference: Ivy League (primary) Other conferences: List: EIWA (wrestling); EARC (rowing); CSA (squash)
- Athletic director: Peter Pilling
- Location: New York, New York
- Varsity teams: 31
- Football stadium: Robert K. Kraft Field at Lawrence A. Wien Stadium
- Basketball arena: Levien Gymnasium
- Baseball stadium: Hal Robertson Field at Phillip Satow Stadium
- Softball stadium: Columbia Softball Stadium
- Soccer stadium: Rocco B. Commisso Soccer Stadium
- Lacrosse stadium: Robert K. Kraft Field at Lawrence A. Wien Stadium
- Volleyball arena: Levien Gymnasium
- Other venues: Blue Gym
- Colors: Columbia blue and white
- Mascot: Roar-ee the Lion
- Fight song: Roar, Lion, Roar
- Website: gocolumbialions.com

The Columbia University Lions are the collective athletic teams and their members from Columbia University, an Ivy League institution in New York City, United States. The current director of athletics is Peter Pilling.

== History ==
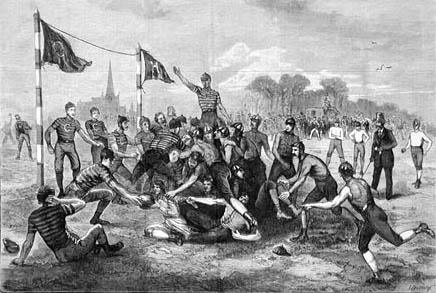
Columbia vs. Harvard game, late 19th century

Intercollegiate sports at Columbia date to the foundation of the baseball team in 1867. Men's association football (i.e. soccer) followed in 1870, and men's crew in 1873.

Men's Crew was one of Columbia's best early sports, and in 1878 the Columbia College Boat Club was the first foreign crew to win a race at the Henley Royal Regatta—considered to be Columbia's greatest athletic achievement.

The third-ever men's intercollegiate soccer match was played between Columbia and Rutgers University, with Rutgers winning 6 to 3. Columbia joined the American football movement soon after Harvard and Yale played their first game in 1875—in 1876, Columbia, Harvard and Princeton University formed the Intercollegiate Football Association. In addition, the Lions' wrestling team is the nation's oldest.

The Columbia football team won the Rose Bowl in 1934, upsetting Stanford University 7–0. Columbia also hosted the first televised sporting event: on May 17, 1939, the fledgling NBC network filmed the baseball double-header of the Light Blue versus the Princeton University Tigers at Columbia's Baker Field at the northernmost point in Manhattan.

== Ivy League athletics ==
The eight-institution athletic league to which Columbia University belongs, the Ivy League, also includes Brown University, Cornell University, Dartmouth College, Harvard University, University of Pennsylvania, Princeton University and Yale University. The Ivy League conference sponsors championships in 33 men's and women's sports and averages 35 varsity teams at each of its eight universities. The League provides intercollegiate athletic opportunities for more men and women than any other conference in the United States. All eight Ivy schools are listed in the top 20 NCAA Division I schools in number of sports offered for both men and women.

== Sports sponsored ==
Men's sports	Women's sports
Baseball	Archery
Basketball	Basketball
Cross country	Cross country
Football	Field hockey
Golf	Golf
Heavyweight rowing	Lacrosse
Lightweight rowing	Rowing
Soccer	Soccer
Squash	Softball
Swimming and diving	Squash
Tennis	Swimming and diving
Track and field^{†}	Tennis
Wrestling	Track and field^{†}
	Volleyball
Co-ed sports
Fencing
† – Track and field includes both indoor and outdoor

=== Archery ===
The women's archery team became a varsity sport at Barnard in 1978 and was absorbed into the Columbia-Barnard Athletic Consortium when Columbia College became co-educational in 1983. Archers compete in both the recurve (Olympic) and compound divisions. Until 2003, the team consisted exclusively of walk-ons with little prior experience; as of 2020, most archers are recruited similar to other varsity sports. Columbia also fields a club-level archery team for male archers and female students interested in learning the sport.

Columbia won outdoor national championships in 2005 (recurve), 2008 (recurve), 2011 (recurve), 2013 (recurve), 2015 (recurve and compound), 2017 (recurve and compound) and 2018 (compound).

In the pandemic-shortened 2020 season, five Lions archers were named to the Collegiate Archery All-American team.

=== American football ===
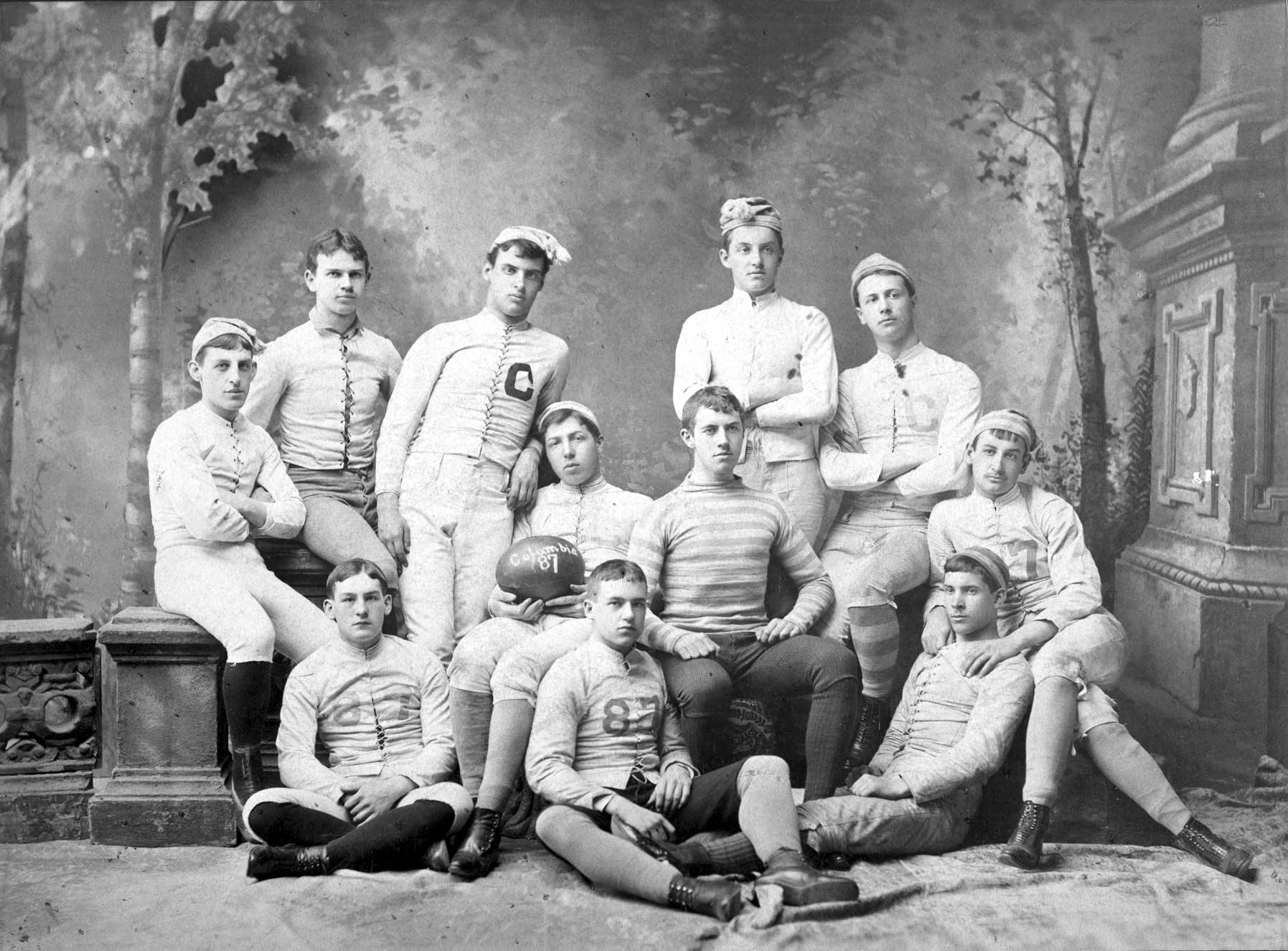
Columbia team of 1887

The Lions compete in the Ivy League, which is part of the NCAA Football Championship Subdivision.

Columbia was one of the first schools to take up the game; Columbia's 1870 contest with Princeton was the first football game played between future Ivy League Schools and their contest against Rutgers that same year was the fourth intercollegiate football game ever played.

During the first half of the 20th century the Columbia Lions were a national power and at times the best football program in the nation. The 1875 squad was named co-national champion over 50 years later by historian Parke Davis, while the 1915 squad went undefeated and untied. The 1933 edition of the Lions won an unofficial national championship by upsetting the top-ranked Stanford Indians 7–0 in the Rose Bowl on New Year's Day 1934. Lou Little, who coached the team from 1930 to 1956, is in the College Football Hall of Fame. Pro and College Football Hall of Fame inductee, Sid Luckman, an NFL MVP and 4-Time NFL Champion played his entire college football career at Columbia. Lou Gehrig additionally played for the Columbia Lions during this period.

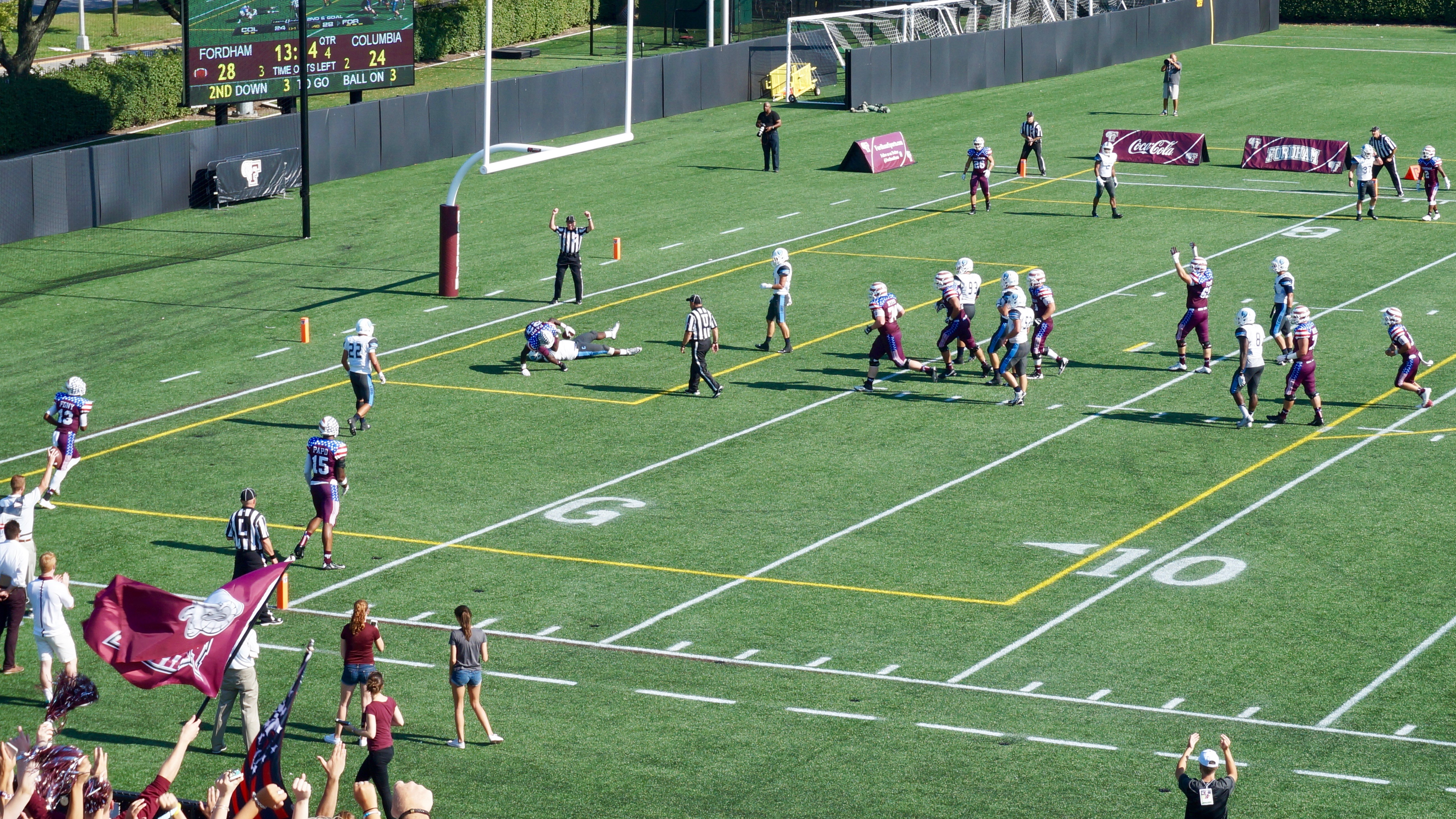
Columbia v Fordham in 2015

Between 1983 and 1988, a period of financial instability for New York City and Columbia University, the Lions lost 44 games in a row. The streak was broken with a 16–13 victory over archrival Princeton. That was the Lions' first victory at Wien Stadium (which was already four years old, having been opened during the streak).

Pro Football Hall of Famer Sid Luckman played his college ball at Columbia, graduating in 1938. Luckman is also in the College Football Hall of Fame. Other Lions to have success in the NFL include offensive lineman George Starke, the Washington Redskins' "Head Hog," during the 1970s and 1980s, quarterback John Witkowski in the 1980s, and defensive lineman Marcellus Wiley in the 1990s. Perhaps the most famous personality associated with Lions football was a running back who had limited success on the field: the writer Jack Kerouac left school and went on the road after one injury-marred season at Columbia. Another Lions back who became legendary for his accomplishments off the gridiron was baseball great Lou Gehrig, who was a two-sport star at Columbia.

Norries Wilson is the first African-American head coach in the history of Ivy League football. He served as the Lions' head coach from 2005 to 2011. Former Penn Quakers football coach Al Bagnoli became Columbia's head coach on February 23, 2015.

Columbia and Cornell play for the Empire Cup, emblematic for Ivy League supremacy in New York State. Since 2018, they have played each other in their season finale.

==== Bowl games ====
Season	Bowl	Champion		Runner-Up	
1934	Rose Bowl	Columbia	7	Stanford	0

=== Baseball ===
Lou Gehrig played college baseball at Columbia (he joined the New York Yankees in 1923, after his sophomore season) as well as Hall of Fame inductee Eddie Collins. In 1939 the first live televised sporting event in the United States, was a Columbia versus Princeton baseball game, broadcast from Baker Field in New York City. Other Columbia Lions who have gone on to play in Major League Baseball include Gene Larkin and Fernando Perez. The team plays at Hal Robertson Field at Phillip Satow Stadium, located at the northern tip of Manhattan.

=== Men's basketball ===
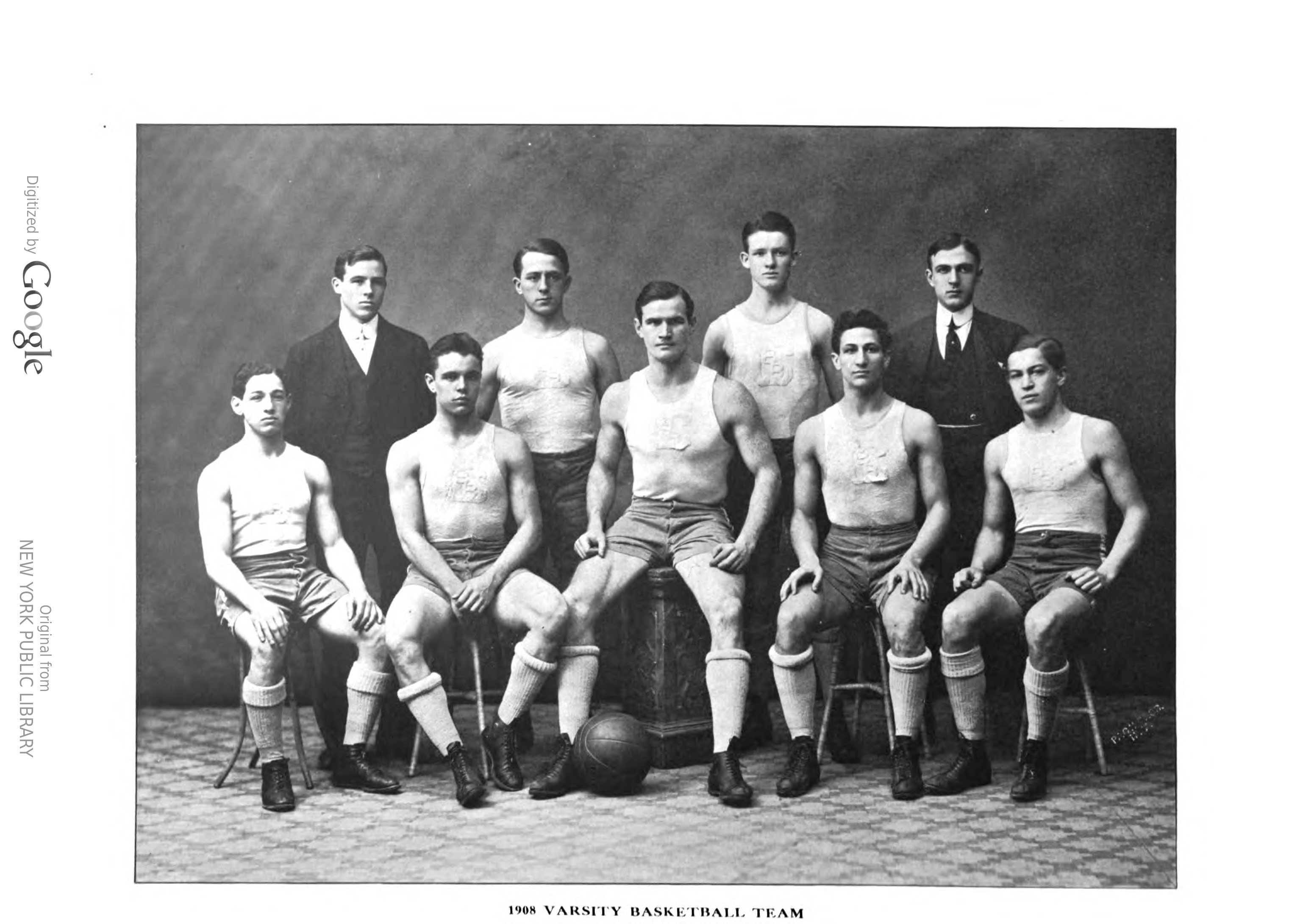
Columbia basketball team, 1908

Columbia was one of the first schools to take up basketball. The Lions' rivalry with the Yale Bulldogs is the longest continuous rivalry in NCAA college basketball (tied with the Yale-Princeton rivalry): the two teams have played each other for 108 seasons in a row, going back to the 1901–1902 season.

The Lions were retroactively recognized as the pre-NCAA Tournament 1904 and 1905 national champions by the Premo-Porretta Power Poll, and as the 1904, 1905 and 1910 national champions by the Helms Athletic Foundation.

During the years just before the Ivy League formally became a sports conference, the Lions made it to "March Madness" on two occasions. In 1948, they were one of eight teams in the tournament, losing in the East regional semifinal to the eventual champion Kentucky. The 1951 team went undefeated in the regular season and were one of the 16 teams invited to the championship. The Lions lost 79–71 to eventual semi-finalist Illinois for a final record of 21–1 (best record in the nation that year with win–loss percentage of .956). The 1951 team is, however, sadly best known for the tragic story of its brilliant but troubled star forward Jack Molinas, who eventually ended up in prison for crimes related his longtime involvement with gambling and who was murdered in 1975 in what appeared to be an organized crime-related assassination. Molinas still holds several school scoring records.

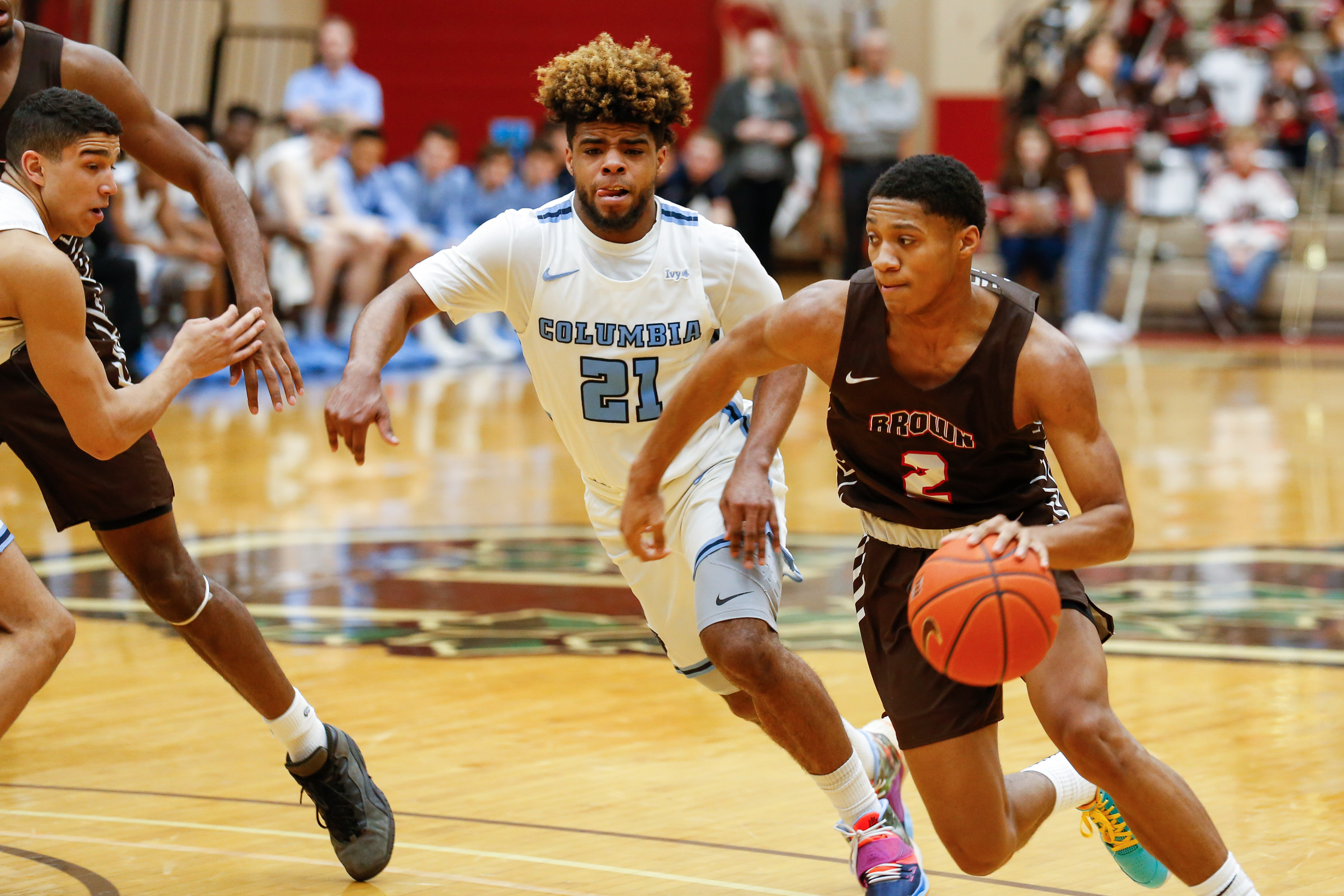
Columbia vs. Brown, 2020

In 1957 Chet Forte was a consensus All-American and UPI player of the year for the NCAA University Division (which was replaced in 1973 by NCAA Division I); he averaged 28.9 points (fifth in the nation). He is even more famous for his later work as a producer for ABC Sports, especially on the program Monday Night Football. The 1957 team had 2,016 rebounds, fourth highest in NCAA Division I history, even though they played only 24 games.

The Lions have only won the official Ivy League championship once, in 1968, when they reached the "Sweet Sixteen" in the NCAA national tournament. Two members of the 1968 team went on to play professional basketball: Jim McMillian and Dave Newmark. (NFL great George Starke was also a member of the Lions' basketball team in that era.) Jack Rohan was voted Coach of the Year in 1968.

The Lions had a powerful squad in the late 1970s, even though they never won the Ivy League championship or made it to post-season play. In 1979, the diminutive point guard Alton Byrd won the Frances Pomeroy Naismith Award, given to the best player under 6 feet (180 cm) in height. Byrd never made it to the NBA, but he moved on to a legendary career in European pro basketball.

=== Women's basketball ===
Until the 1980s, the women's basketball team (like the other women's teams) was known as the Barnard Bears, playing under the aegis of Columbia's affiliated undergraduate women's college, Barnard College. When Columbia College went co-ed in 1983, the schools formed the Columbia-Barnard Athletic Consortium, and today all Barnard athletes compete on Columbia teams.

The women's basketball team joined the Ivy League in 1986–1987, and for many years were a perennial cellar dweller, reaching their low point in 1994–1995, when they went 0–26. They had never finished higher than fourth in the league standings in their first 23 seasons. In 2009–2010, however, they finished third, putting together a 9–5 record in the Ivy League, and, at 18–10 overall, their first winning season. In 2016, Megan Griffith became Columbia's head coach and has since been the program's winningest coach, leading the team to consecutive winning seasons since the 2019-20 season.

In 2023, Columbia tied with Princeton for their first regular season conference championship. After just missing out on the NCAA tournament that year, Columbia went on to become the runner-up in the WNIT tournament. Columbia tied with Princeton again in 2024 and made its first NCAA tournament appearance as an at-large team, playing in the first four. In 2025 Columbia won its first outright Ivy League title and once more made the NCAA tournament as an at-large team, advancing from the first four for their first NCAA tournament win, before losing in the first round of the tournament.

=== Soccer ===
Columbia's soccer program traces its origins to the same Columbia-Rutgers game that the gridiron football program counts as its first contest. (The 1870 Columbia-Rutgers game was played by a set of rules which combined elements of present-day soccer and rugby.) The Lions soccer team has a long history of success, spanning three centuries, highlighted by national collegiate championships in 1909 and 1910 (Intercollegiate Soccer Football League), and a second-place finish in the 1983 NCAA championship. Dieter Ficken was named NSCAA Coach of the Year in 1983 after the Lions' 1–0 double-overtime finals loss to seven-time champion Indiana University. Eighteen Lions players have been first-team all-Americans, and Amr Aly earned the 1984 Hermann Trophy national player of the year award.

The women's team was the 2006 Ivy League champions. In 2016, the men's soccer team were Co-Ivy League Champions.

=== Women's cross-country ===
- Caroline Bierbaum won the 2005 women's cross country Honda Sports Award (most outstanding NCAA women's cross country athlete of the year) and was NCAA Division I runner-up, with a time of 19:46.0.
- Top-25 national finishes from 2000 through 2005
- Five straight Heptagonal Ivy League Championships: 2001, 2002, 2003, 2004 and 2005

=== Fencing ===
The Blue Gym (or University Gym) is home to the Columbia Lions fencing team, located within the Dodge Physical Fitness Center on campus.

- Co-ed NCAA champions: 1992, 1993, 2015, 2016 and 2019
- Co-ed NCAA runners-up: 1990, 1991, and 2025
- 7 co-ed individual national championships
- 6 co-ed weapon team national championships
- 16 top-6 co-ed national finishes in 17 years, 1990–2006
- Men's NCAA champions: 1951, 1952, 1954 (tied), 1955, 1963, 1965, 1968, 1971 (tied), 1987, 1988 and 1989
- Men's NCAA runners-up: 1956, 1957, 1958, 1970, 1986, and 2026
- 21 men's individual national champions
- Women's NCAA runner-up: 1989 and 2026
- 2 women's individual national champions
- 6 Intercollegiate Fencing Association national team championships in men’s foils: 1898, 1913, 1914, 1918, 1919; 3-weapon: 1934

=== Men's golf ===
- A.L. Walker Jr., NCAA champion, 1919
- Ivy League championships (since 1975): 1999, 2008, 2009, 2010 and 2014

=== Men's ice hockey ===
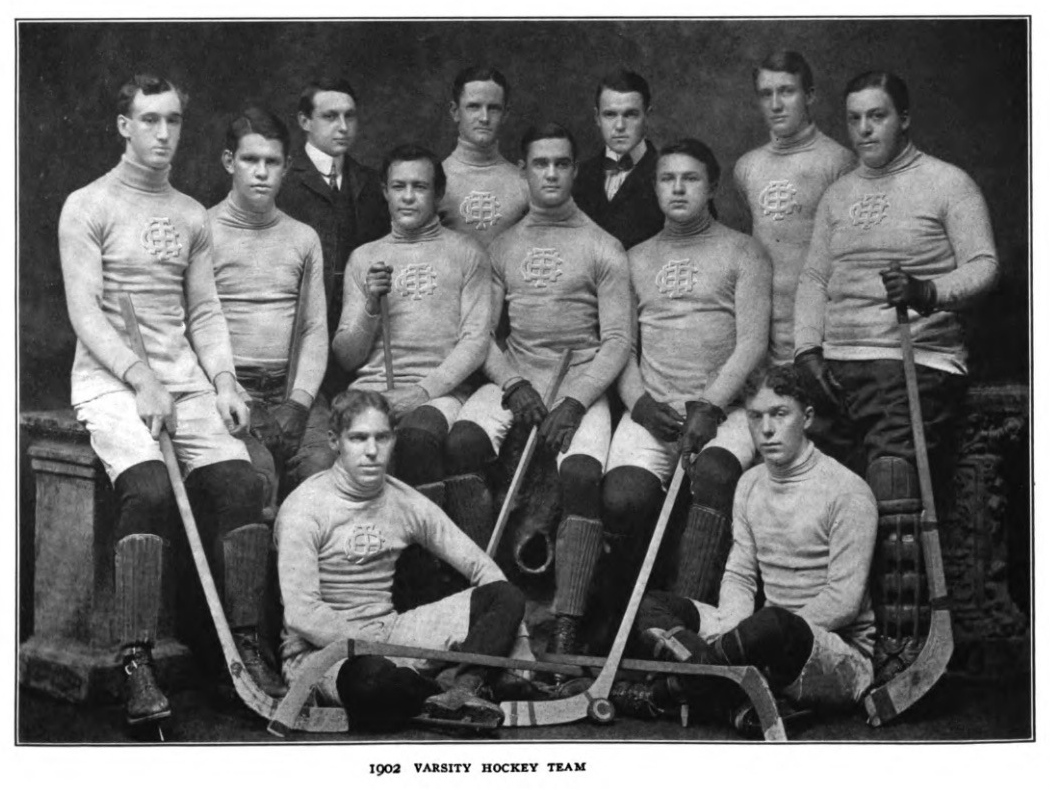
Varsity ice hockey team of Columbia University for the 1901–02 season

Columbia University had a team early on in the American intercollegiate ice hockey circuit. Columbia had a team organized already during the 1896–97 season and during the 1897–98 campaign the university appeared in the Intercollegiate Hockey Association (IHA) alongside teams from Yale, Brown, and University of Pennsylvania, and the school was continuously represented in organized ice hockey league games against other Ivy League institutions (Yale, Brown, Harvard, Princeton, Dartmouth and Cornell) up until the mid-1910s.

As of 2020, Columbia does not have a varsity ice hockey team. Columbia does participate at the club level, competing in the American Collegiate Hockey Association.

=== Men's rowing ===
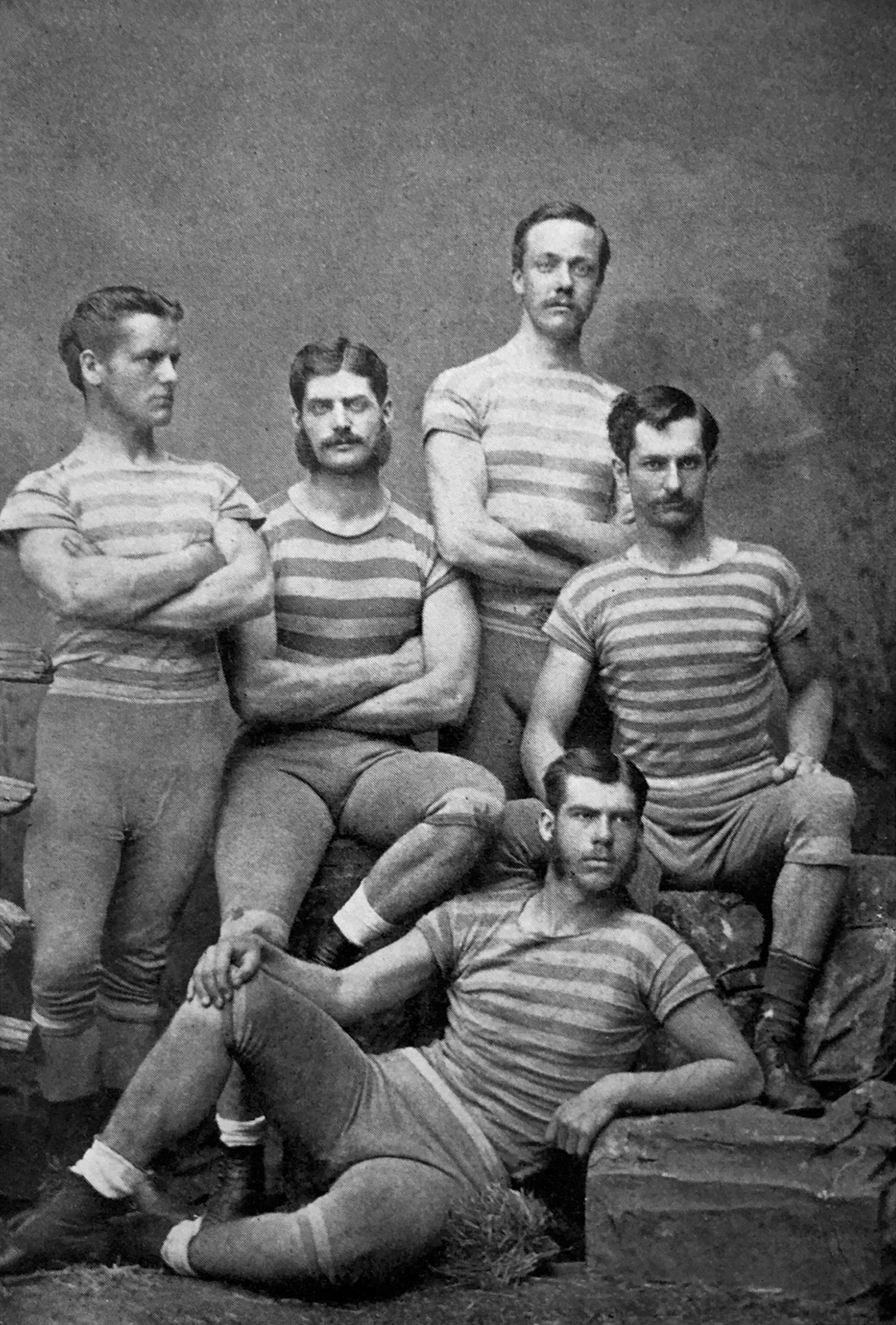
Columbia College, winners of the Visitors' Challenge Cup in 1878

Columbia's first intercollegiate regatta dates back to 1873, when it raced a six-oared shell in Springfield, Massachusetts. The next year, Columbia won the intercollegiate title at Saratoga.

- In 2022, the men's varsity lightweight eight took gold at the Intercollegiate Rowing Association National Championships after placing 6th at the Eastern Sprints Head Coach Nich Lee Parker was awarded the IRA Lightweight coach of the year.
- In 2018, both the men's 1st and 2nd varsity lightweight eights and won gold medals at the Eastern Sprints. The lightweights also captured the Jope Cup team award for the first time in the program's history.
- In 2016, the men's varsity lightweight eight won gold medals at the Intercollegiate Rowing Association National Championships. The men's varsity lightweight 4+ earned silver medals, enabling Columbia to win the IRA Lightweight Team Trophy. The varsity lightweights eight went on to reach the quarterfinals of the Temple Challenge Cup at the Henley Royal Regatta.
- In 2015, both the men's varsity lightweight eight and the varsity lightweight four took the silver at the Intercollegiate Rowing Association National Championships and reached the semifinals in the Temple Challenge Cup at the Henley Royal Regatta in Henley-on-Thames, UK.
- In 2014, the men's varsity lightweights took the bronze at the Intercollegiate Rowing Association National Championships.
- In 2008, the men's heavyweight crew had a regular season record of 10–1 and finished sixth in the nation at the Intercollegiate Rowing Association National Championship being the only Ivy League school in the Grand Final. They then went on to be the only American crew competing for The Ladies' Challenge Plate at the Henley Royal Regatta.
- The 2003 varsity lightweights went 11–2, gained silver medals after finishing second in both the Eastern Sprints and the IRA National Lightweight Championship, and became the first Columbia crew ever to capture all four cup races in a single season.
- In 2000, the varsity lightweights won the Eastern Sprints, the first time a Columbia varsity has captured the prestigious event, and earned a bronze medal at the Intercollegiate Rowing Association National Championship. The same year, it won England's Marlow Regatta and took its second trip to Henley in three years, again reaching the quarterfinals.
- In 1998 the varsity lightweights won silver medals at the Intercollegiate Rowing Association National Championship, won England's Reading Town Regatta and reached the quarterfinals of the Temple Challenge Cup at the Henley Royal Regatta.
- In 1995, the freshman lightweights earned Columbia's first Eastern Sprints medal in 24 years, and were named the EARC Outstanding Lightweight Boat of the Year. The next year, the varsity lightweights earned national acclaim when they went 10–1 and won the Augusta Regatta, the Geiger Cup and the Subin Cup, and were third in the IRA Regatta—the first Lions varsity crew to medal at the Intercollegiate Rowing Association National Championships in 25 years.
- In 1971, Columbia's varsity lightweight crew won a silver medal at Eastern Sprints. The crew competed at the Henley Royal Regatta where they advanced to the semifinals in the Thames Challenge Cup.
- In 1964, the freshman lightweight crew had a perfect season, winning all five of its regular season races, and won a gold medal at Eastern Sprints by two-tenths of a second.
- In both 1932 and 1928, the varsity lightweights won the Joseph Wright Challenge Cup at the American Rowing Association Regatta—also known as the American Henley Regatta, and generally regarded as the lightweight national championships—on the Schuylkill River. The 1928 crew won over Penn by five boat-lengths. In 1929 the varsity lightweight eight was undefeated in match racing, and captured 2nd place at the American Henley before traveling to England where they won the Marlow Regatta and made it to the semifinals of the Thames Challenge Cup at the Henley Royal Regatta. It was Columbia's first return to Henley since their 1878 victory, and it marked the first-ever appearance of a lightweight crew at Henley. They were the first lightweight crew to be awarded a Varsity "Major C" for creating a favorable impression abroad and adding rowing honors to Columbia and to the sport in the United States.
- Columbia varsity 8 won the Intercollegiate Rowing Association championship in 1914, 1927, and 1929.
- In 1895, with Cornell and Penn, the Lions competed in the first-ever race for the college championship and finished first. This would come to be known as the Poughkeepsie Regatta, a competition to award the national intercollegiate rowing crown. Presently, this race is known as the Intercollegiate Rowing Association Regatta. The Varsity 8s also won the regatta in 1914, 1927 and 1929
- In 1879 the varsity 4 won the Rowing Association of American Colleges Regatta on Lake George.
- In 1878 the Columbia College Boat Club won the Visitors' Challenge Cup for coxless-fours at the famed Henley Royal Regatta to become the first foreign crew to win a cup at the regatta (1st race, defeated University College, Oxford; final, defeated Hertford College, Oxford)
- In 1874 the varsity 6 won the Rowing Association of American Colleges Regatta on Lake Saratoga.

=== Men's squash ===
- First varsity season: 2010–2011
- Head Coach: Jacques Swanepoel
- Ivy League runner-up: 2015, 2016, 2017
- Ivy League champion: 2018
- Finished 4th in the country in 2015 and 2017, 3rd in 2018
- Osama Khalifa, first-ever Columbia squash player to be crowned national individual champion, 2017. Also named William V. Campbell Performer of the Year (male).

=== Women's squash ===
- Coaches: Jacques Swanepoel, Joanne Schickerling, Chris Sachvie

=== Men's swimming and diving ===
- Head Coach: Jim Bolster
- 8 individual NCAA Division I championships

Historical note:

1976 – First and only female varsity athlete at Columbia (before Columbia College began admitting women): Annemarie McCoy competed against the Lions' opponents. Thanks to Title IX, all Columbia University students (including those women from The School of Engineering and Applied Science) were eligible for Columbia athletic programs—and so McCoy was able to stay afloat with her teammates.

=== Women's swimming and diving ===
- Head coach Diana Caskey and assistant coach Demerae Christianson
- 2013–2014 Ivy League Dual Meet Championship Team
- 4 individual NCAA Division I championships
- Cristina Teuscher, 1999–2000 Honda-Broderick Cup winner (NCAA Collegiate Woman Athlete of the Year)

=== Men's tennis ===
- Ivy League Champions 2009
- Ivy League Champions 2007
- NCAA Division I tournament appearances, 1984, 1987, 1998, 2000
- Robert LeRoy, two-time ILTA singles champion, 1904 and 1906
- Oliver Campbell and A.E. Wright, ILTA doubles champions, 1889
- Oliver Campbell and V.G. Hall, ILTA doubles champions, 1888
- Michael Zheng, two-time NCAA singles champion, 2024 and 2025

=== Men's track and field ===
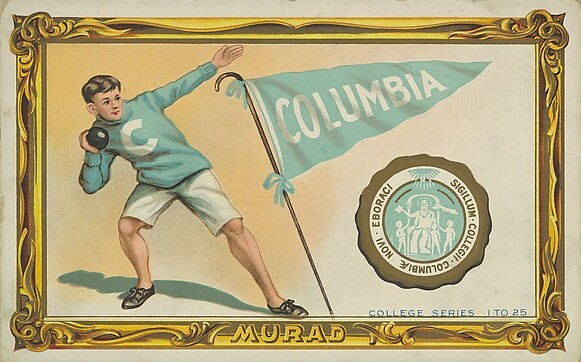
A cigarette card from Murad cigarettes, c. 1910

- Founded in 1869
- 3 outdoor track and field individual NCAA Division I championships
- 3 outdoor intercollegiate team national championships in 1877, 1878, and 1879
- 2 IC4A indoor national team championships in 1937 and 1938
- Once sported the world's fastest man, Benjamin Washington Johnson, the 'Columbia Comet'. The sprinting champion's most incredible achievement was at the 1938 Millrose Games, in front of more than 17,000 fans at Madison Square Garden. His winning time in the 60-yard dash was 5.9 seconds, breaking the world record of 6.2 seconds for the third time in the same day. His final time of 5.9 seconds was rounded up to 6.0 seconds, because the referees claimed it must have been a timing error, arguing that no human being could ever break 6 seconds in the 60-yard dash.
- In 2007, Columbia won the Championship of America 4 × 800 m race at the prestigious Penn Relays. The team of Michael Mark, Jonah Rathbun, Erison Hurtault and Liam Boylan-Pett ran 7:22.64, outkicking the anchor legs of national powerhouses Michigan, Villanova and Oral Roberts. The team has finished no lower than fifth in the past three years.
- In March 2010, Kyle Merber became the first Columbia athlete to break four minutes in the mile, running 3:58.52 at the Columbia Last Chance Meet at the 168th St. Armory. The mark is also an Ivy League indoor record.

=== Wrestling ===
Dating back to 1903, wrestling has a long history at Columbia. In 2024, Donny Pritzlaff became the 10th head coach in program history, succeeding Zach Tanelli, who was head coach from 2016 to 2024. The Lions wrestling team currently competes in the Eastern Intercollegiate Wrestling Association (EIWA) Conference. Columbia has had 25 EIWA Conference Champions and seven NCAA All-Americans, most recently Lennox Wolak, who placed 6th in 2024 at the NCAA Wrestling Championships. The Blue Gym (or University Gym) is home to the Columbia Lions wrestling team, located within the Dodge Physical Fitness Center on campus.

=== Other ===
- Men's gymnastics team won the intercollegiate championship meet in 1900.
- The rifle team won the indoor national title in 1908 and an outdoor national title in 1924.

== The Lions ==
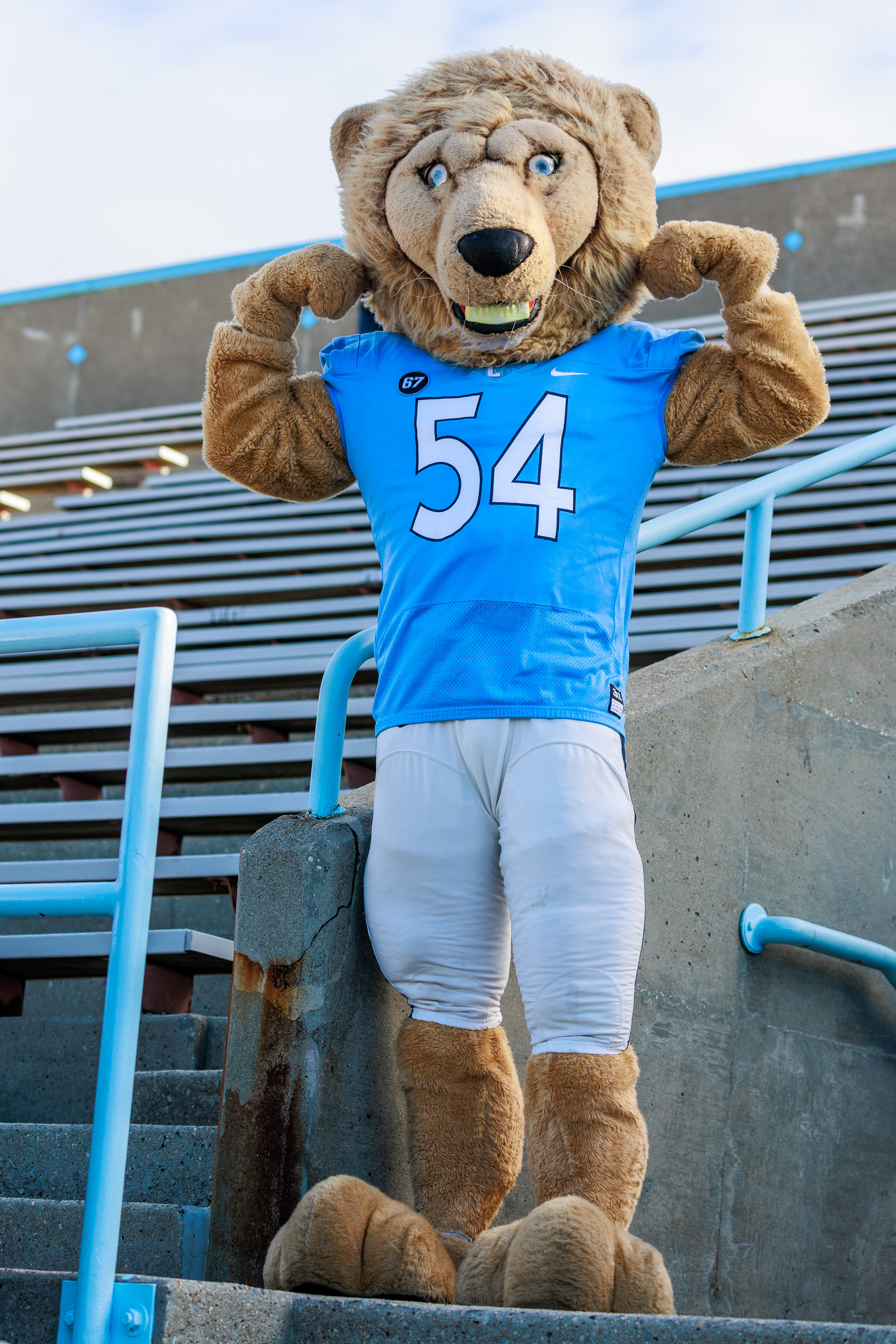
Roar-ee the Lion in 2024

Columbia University was founded in 1754 and currently fields 31 co-ed, men's and women's teams. Women's teams are cooperatively organized with the affiliated Barnard College.

All Columbia teams compete at the Division I level in the National Collegiate Athletic Association (NCAA). The school's football team competes at the NCAA Division I FCS level.

In 1910, the school adopted the lion mascot as a reference to the institution's royal past. The university was originally named King's College since its charter in 1754 by King George II of Great Britain. It became Columbia College in 1784, after the American Revolution. It became Columbia University in 1896 with the move to its current location in Upper Manhattan.

== Notable athletes ==
The Lions have produced such notable athletes as:

- Amr Aly – Soccer
- Norman Armitage – Fencing
- Eddie Collins – Baseball
- Horace Davenport – Crew (Rowing)
- Delilah DiCrescenzo – Track and Field
- Nadia Eke – Track and Field
- Sherif Farrag – Fencing
- Chet Forte – Basketball
- Lou Gehrig – Baseball
- Joel Glucksman – Fencing
- Paul Governali – Football
- Andrew Hawkins - Football
- Erison Hurtault – Track and Field
- Emily Jacobson – Fencing
- Mark Shepherd – Lacrosse
- Ben Johnson – Track and Field
- Dan Kellner – Fencing
- Osama Khalifa – Squash
- Tanvi Khanna – Squash
- Gene Larkin – Baseball
- James Margolis – Fencing
- Jim McMillian – Basketball
- James Melcher – Fencing
- Sid Luckman – Football
- Nat Pendleton – Wrestling
- Fernando Perez – Baseball
- Nzingha Prescod – Fencing
- Nicole Ross – Fencing
- Daria Schneider – Fencing
- Erinn Smart – Fencing
- Jeff Spear – Fencing
- George Starke – Football
- Ramit Tandon – Squash
- Cristina Teuscher – Swimming
- Marcellus Wiley – Football
- James Leighman Williams – Fencing
