= Harvey Love =

American rower and coach (1910–1963)

Biographical details
- Born: August 18, 1910; Seattle, Washington, U.S.
- Died: January 14, 1963 (aged 52); Cambridge, Massachusetts, U.S.
- Education: University of Washington

Playing career

Rowing
- 1930, 1932–1934: Washington
- Position: Coxswain

Coaching career (HC unless noted)

Rowing
- 1936–1951: Harvard (Freshmen)
- 1951–1962: Harvard

Accomplishments and honors

Championships
- Grand Challenge Cup (1959); Eastern Sprints (1959)

Harvey M. Love (August 18, 1910 – January 14, 1963) was an American rower and coach who competed for the Washington Huskies and coached the Harvard Crimson.

Love attended the University of Washington and rowed for the Huskies' freshman crew in 1930. He dropped out of school in order to work but returned after a year. He spent two years on the junior varsity crew and was a member of the varsity crew his senior year. He graduated in 1934.

Love assisted Washington's freshmen coach Thomas Bolles after graduating and followed him to Harvard in 1936 when Bolles became the Crimson's varsity coach. After 15 years as Harvard's freshman coach, Love succeeded Bolles when he became the school's athletic director. In 1959, Love coached Harvard to its first undefeated season since 1948, which included victory in the Eastern Sprints and Grand Challenge Cup.

Love died suddenly on January 14, 1963. He was 52 years old.
