= Colin Farrell (disambiguation) =

Colin Farrell (born 1976) is an Irish actor.

Colin Farrell (or similar variances) may also refer to:

- Colin Farrell (rugby union) (born 1956), former New Zealand rugby player
- Colin Farrell (rower), American rower
- Colin Ferrell (born 1984), American football player
