= Rowing Association of American Colleges =

The Rowing Association of American Colleges (1870 to 1894), the first collegiate athletic organization in the United States, was a body governing college rowing. Upon organization by the captains of the leading crews of the day, they devised a primary rule of eligibility: that only undergraduate students should be eligible to represent their college in the regatta. To this day, despite numerous amendments and additions, this rule remains the very foundation of the NCAA rules of eligibility.

== Collegiate regatta ==
This table lists the winners of the marquee events of the championship regattas conducted by the RAAC from its founding through 1894.

| Year | Champion | Event | Year | Champion | Event | Year | Champion | Event | Year | Champion | Event |
| 1871 | Massachusetts Agricultural College | 6s | 1877 | | | 1883 | Cornell University | 4s | 1889 | Cornell | 8s |
| 1872 | Amherst College | 6s | 1878 | | | 1884 | University of Pennsylvania | 4s | 1890 | Cornell University | 8s |
| 1873 | Yale College | 6s | 1879 | Columbia College | 4s | 1885 | Cornell University | 4s | 1891 | Cornell University | 8s |
| 1874 | Columbia College | 6s | 1880 | Cornell University | 4s | 1886 | Bowdoin College | 4s | 1892 | Cornell University | 8s |
| 1875 | Cornell University | 6s | 1881 | | | 1887 | Cornell University | 4s | 1893 | Cornell University | 8s |
| 1876 | Cornell University | 6s | 1882 | University of Pennsylvania | 4s | 1888 | Yale University | 8s | 1894 | Cornell University | 8s |

RAAC university race results
| Year | Location | Venue | Entries | Winner | Harvard | Yale |
|---|---|---|---|---|---|---|
| 1871 (July 21) (Note: The first regatta of the Rowing Association of American Colleges was held July 21, 1871, at Ingleside, Massachusetts, on the Connecticut River. Massachusetts Agricultural College won the university race with Harvard second and Brown University third. Yale did not participate (nor join the RAAC) but continued to dispute its disqualification in the 1870 race with Harvard.) | Ingleside MA | Connecticut River | 3 | Massachusetts Agricultural College | 2 | — |
| 1872 (Note: In the RAAC university race of 1872, Harvard finished second and Yale sixth among six entries. Amherst College won in 16:32.8 or 24.2 seconds ahead of Harvard. The crew generally rowed 40 to 46 strokes per minute. According to The New York Times, "A very strong current and quite a fresh breeze helped them along".) | Springfield, MA | Connecticut River | 6 | Amherst College | 2 | 6 |
| 1873 (Note: In the RAAC university race of 1873, Yale was finally declared the winner and the other places were not declared. "Shortly before midnight the referee announced that he would only decide upon the first position for the time being, and Yale he declared the winner of the race. The decision on other positions are reserved for a future time. Capt. Babcock, the referee, has stated to the Harvard boys that he is compelled technically, to award the University race to Yale, but he stated that the flags were not correctly placed at the finish, and that, consequently, the course on the east shore was much greater than on the west shore. The Harvards claim that the champion flags were awarded to them by the judges, whose judgment, like that of many others, was that Harvard had arrived at the finish in advance of all the crews ...") | Springfield MA | Connecticut River | ? | Yale College | (2) | 1 |
| 1874 (Note: After two days of postponements a much diminished crowd watched the university race of the RAAC Regatta at Saratoga in 1874. Columbia won the race (unofficial time 16:42) officially followed by Wesleyan, Harvard, and six others, finally Yale. "It was unanimously acknowledged that Yale had the lead and Harvard second.Harvard's boat then ran into the Yale boat, breaking the latters' rudder.") | Saratoga, NY | Lake Saratoga | 9 | Columbia College | 3 | 9 |
| 1875 (Note: In the RAAC university race of 1875, Harvard finished third and Yale fifth among thirteen boats. Cornell won the race. Yale had been the betting favorite with Cornell second.) | Saratoga NY | Lake Saratoga | 13 | Cornell | 3 | 5 |
| 1876 (Note: Yale defeated Harvard soundly in a race of eight-oared boats in Springfield on June 30. Harvard continued west to Saratoga for the RAAC Regatta ("the Harvard six", for the Association championship matched "coxless sixes") but Yale did not participate. Harvard did not participate again and the Association disintegrated during the next several years. Regarding the Saratoga and Springfield events: "Yale does not row there, and Harvard will not after this year, but the eight-oared bout between Yale and Harvard, so successfully inaugurated to-day, will undoubtedly become an annual and permanent institution.") | Saratoga NY | Lake Saratoga | ? | Cornell | ? | — |
| 1877 | (none) | | | | | |
| 1878 | (none) | | | | | |

On June 30, 1876, Harvard and Yale raced eight-oared boats with coxswains over a 4-mile course on the Connecticut River. (Note: The 1876 Harvard–Yale race introduced both the eight-oar crews with coxswain and the 4-mile distance, two features borrowed from the Oxford and Cambridge Boat Race.)Afterward "the Harvard six left for Saratoga. Yale does not row there, and Harvard will not after this year, but the eight-oared bout between Yale and Harvard, so successfully inaugurated to-day, will undoubtedly become an annual and permanent institution."

From 1871 to 1875 Harvard and Yale did not race head-on. Both participated in the RAAC university race from 1872 to 1875 (as Harvard did also in 1871 and 1876), and the Harvard–Yale Regatta recognizes Harvard–Yale varsity races to be incorporated in those RAAC championships.

== See also ==
- Intercollegiate Rowing Association
- Poughkeepsie Regatta
- National Association of Amateur Oarsmen
- 1872 National Association of Amateur Oarsmen. The Effect of New York's Elite Athletic Clubs
