= Thomas Bolles =

American coach and university administrator

Biographical details
- Born: September 25, 1902; Willow River, Minnesota, U.S.
- Died: December 17, 1978 (aged 76); Raleigh, North Carolina, U.S.
- Education: University of Washington

Playing career

Rowing
- 1923–1926: Washington
- Position: Coxswain

Coaching career (HC unless noted)

Rowing
- 1927–1935: Washington (Freshmen)
- 1936–1951: Harvard

Administrative career (AD unless noted)
- 1951–1963: Harvard

Head coaching record
- Overall: 61–15

Accomplishments and honors

Championships
- Poughkeepsie Regatta (1926); Grand Challenge Cup (1939, 1950); Eastern Sprints (1947, 1948, 1949)

Thomas D. Bolles (September 25, 1902 – December 17, 1978) was an American coach and administrator for Harvard University. He served as the coach of the Harvard Crimson varsity crew from 1936 to 1951 and was the school's athletic director from 1951 until 1963.

== Early life ==
Bolles was born in Willow River, Minnesota and grew up in Seattle. He attended West Seattle High School, the Washington State Preparatory School, and the University of Washington. He received his bachelor's degree in 1926 and his master's degree in 1936.

== Athletics ==
=== Washington ===
Bolles was a member of the Washington crew that won the 1926 Poughkeepsie Regatta. In 1928 he was appointed coach of the Washington freshmen crew and assistant to varsity coach Al Ulbrickson Sr. His teams won the Pacific Coast Conference championship eight times in his nine years as coach. Bolles was also an assistant English professor at UW.

=== Harvard ===
In 1936, Bolles was named head coach of the Harvard Crimson varsity crew. In 1939 he led Harvard to its first Grand Challenge Cup victory at the Henley Royal Regatta since 1915. No races were held during World War II. During this time, Bolles served in the United States Navy Reserve, where he taught V-12 courses. Racing resumed in 1946 and Harvard won the Eastern Sprints in 1947, 1948, and 1949. The 1947 team set the world record for the 2000 meter sprint. Harvard won the Grand Challenge Cup again in 1950. His career record at Harvard was 61 wins and 15 losses, which included a 10–1 record in the Harvard–Yale Regatta.

Bolles left coaching in 1951 to become Harvard's director of athletics. He retired on August 31, 1963.

=== Olympics ===
Bolles managed the United States' 1952 Olympic and 1956 Olympic rowing teams. He later served as chairman of the United States Olympic Rowing Committee and led planning for the 1964 Olympics.

== Personal life ==
In 1936, Bolles married Catherine Hope of New York and Washington D.C. Hope was the secretary to United States Secretary of the Interior Harold L. Ickes. They had two children. Catherine (Hope) Bolles died in 1968.

While at Harvard, Bolles resided in Watertown, Massachusetts and Francestown, New Hampshire. He spent his later years in Raleigh, North Carolina and Clearwater, Florida. Bolles died on December 17, 1978, of a heart attack. He was survived by his second wife and two children.
