= 2015 MAAC men's lacrosse tournament =

American college lacrosse tournament

The 2015 MAAC Men's Lacrosse Championship took place from April 30 to May 2 that year at Tenney Stadium in Poughkeepsie, New York, United States. The winner of the tournament received the Metro Atlantic Athletic Conference's automatic bid to the 2015 NCAA Division I Men's Lacrosse Championship. Four teams from the MAAC conference will compete in the single elimination tournament. The seeds were based upon the teams' regular season conference record.

== Standings ==
Only the top four teams in the Metro Atlantic Athletic conference advanced to the MAAC Conference Tournament.

Seed	School	Conference	Overall	Tiebreakers
1	Marist‡*	6-0	14–4	
2	Detroit*	4–2	8–6	1-0 vs. Quinnipiac
3	Quinnipiac*	4–2	7–8	0-1 vs. Detroit
4	Monmouth*	3–3	6–8	
5	Sienna	2-4	5-9	
6	Canisius	2–4	3-12	
7	Manhattan	0–6	1-14	
‡ MAAC regular season champions. * Qualify for the tournament.

== Schedule ==
Session	Game	Time*	Matchup^{#}	Score	Television
Semi-finals – Thursday, April 30
1	1	4:00 pm	#2 Quinnipiac vs. #3 Detroit	16-9	N/A
1	2	7:00 pm	#1 Marist vs. #4 Monmouth	11-6	N/A
Championship – Saturday, May 2
2	3	2:00pm	#1 Marist vs. #2 Quinnipiac	16-14	ESPN 3
*Game times in EST. #-Rankings denote tournament seeding.

== Bracket ==
Tenney Stadium - Poughkeepsie, New York

Semifinals; April 30
1	Marist	11
4	Monmouth	6
2	Quinnipiac	16
3	Detroit	9

Championship Game; May 2
1	Marist	16
2	Quinnipiac	14

- denotes an overtime game

== All-Tournament ==
Shayne Adams, Detroit

Brandon Beauregard, Detroit

John Castellano, Monmouth

Ryan Horsch, Monmouth

Jack Brust, Quinnipiac

Mike Sagl, Quinnipiac

Mike Begley, Marist

Karl Kreshpane, Marist

Joseph Radin, Marist

Most Outstanding Player Dave Scarcello, Marist
