= Ralph T. Jope Cup =

Rowing award

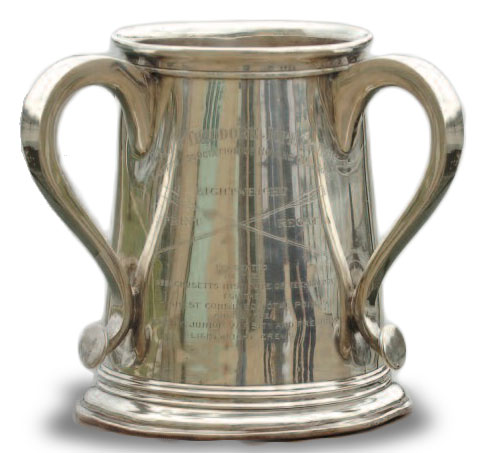
- Sport: Rowing
- Competition: Eastern Sprints
- Awarded for: Lightweight Team Award
- Presented by: Eastern Association of Rowing Colleges

History
- First winner: Cornell University (1963)
- Most wins: Harvard University (22)
- Most recent: University of Pennsylvania

The Ralph T. Jope Cup is a rowing award presented to the Eastern Association of Rowing Colleges (EARC) in 1963, by the Massachusetts Institute of Technology, and is awarded annually at the Eastern Sprints to the member college whose lightweight crews score the highest total points in the varsity, junior varsity and first freshman races under a scoring formula developed by the EARC coaches.

Ralph T. Jope Cup Scoring Formula
Rank	Varsity	Junior Varsity	Freshman / 3V
1st	15	13	11
2nd	13	11	10
3rd	11	10	9
4th	10	9	8
5th	9	8	7
6th	8	7	6
7th	6	5	5
8th	5	4	4
9th	4	3	3
10th	3	2	2
11th	2	1	1
Total	86	74	66

In 2015, the points from the freshman race were replaced with the third varsity race.

A graduate of MIT in the class of 1928, Ralph T. Jope served as Secretary to the Institute's Advisory Council on Athletics for many years. A long-time supporter of the sport of rowing, Mr. Jope died in 1965.

Harvard University has won the Jope Cup a record 22 times, with Princeton University having 16 wins, and Yale University having 10. The most recent winner is the University of Pennsylvania.

== Overall Ranking ==
Rank	College	Times Won
1	Harvard	22
2	Princeton	16
3	Yale	10
4	Cornell	6
5	Navy	2
5	Pennsylvania	2
6	Columbia	1
6	Dartmouth	1

== Winners by year ==
Year	Winner
1963	Cornell
1964	Cornell
1965	Harvard
1966	Harvard
1967	Penn
1968	Harvard
1969	Harvard
1970	Harvard
1971	Harvard
1972	Harvard
1973	Harvard
1974	Harvard
1975	Harvard
1976	Harvard
1977	Harvard
1978	Harvard
1979	Harvard
1980	Harvard
1981	Princeton
1982	Harvard
1983	Princeton
1984	Princeton
1985	Princeton
1986	Princeton
1987	Princeton
1988	Princeton
1989	Yale
1990	Princeton
1991	Harvard
1992	Cornell
1993	Dartmouth
1994	Yale
1995	Princeton
1996	Princeton
1997	Yale
1998	Princeton
1999	Princeton
2000	Princeton
2001	Yale
2002	Yale
2003	Princeton
2004	Harvard
2005	Harvard
2006	Navy
2007	Navy
2008	Cornell
2009	Harvard
2010	Princeton
2011	Harvard
2012	Yale
2013	Yale
2014	Cornell
2015	Cornell (Note: In 2015, the points from the freshman race were replaced with the 3rd varsity race)
2016	Yale
2017	Harvard
2018	Columbia
2019	Yale
2022	Yale
2023	Princeton
2024	Penn
