= Poughkeepsie Regatta =

Annual championship regatta

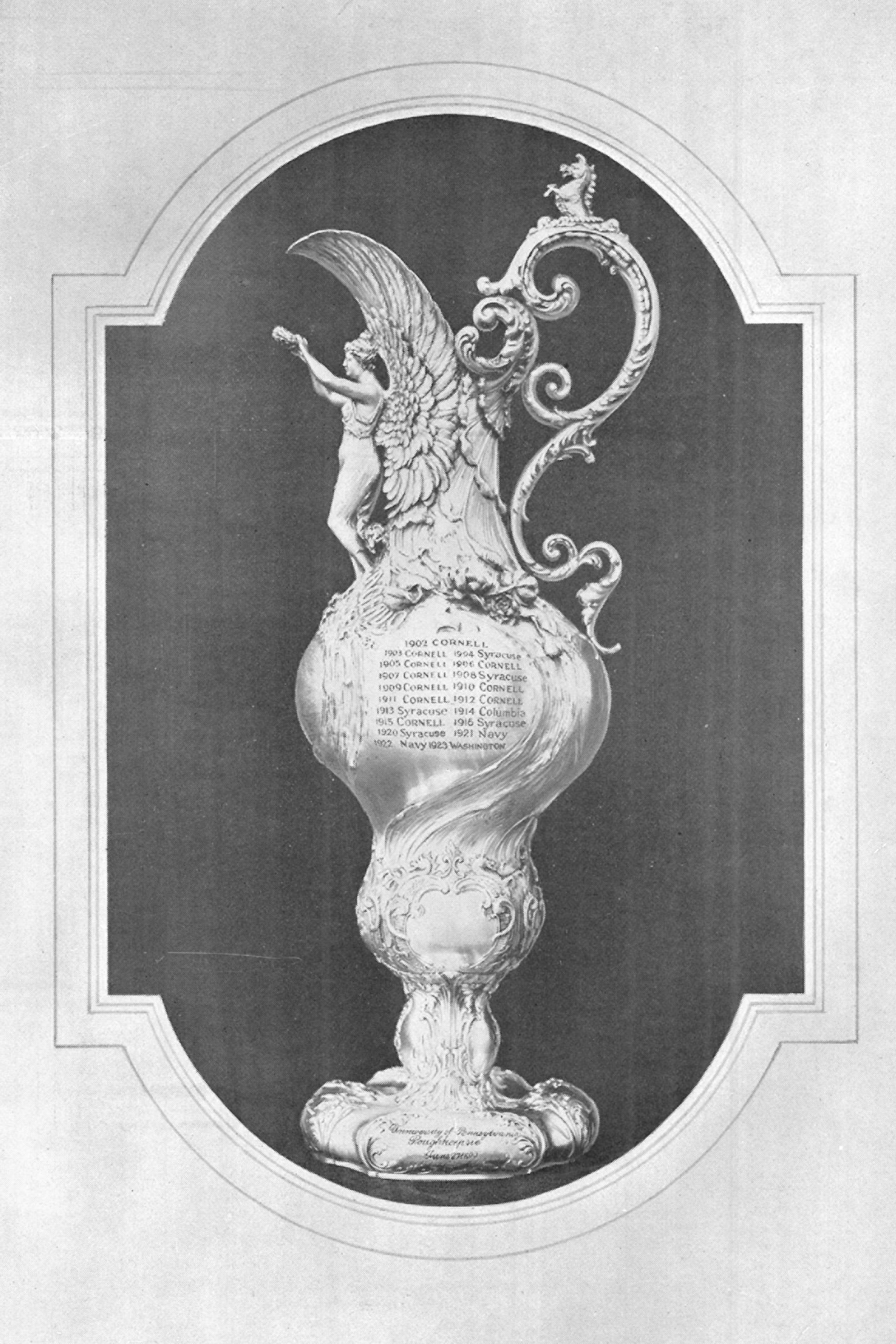
- Poughkeepsie Cup
- Sport: College rowing
- Founded: 1895; 131 years ago
- Country: United States

The Poughkeepsie Regatta was the annual championship regatta of the U.S. Intercollegiate Rowing Association (IRA) when it was held in Poughkeepsie, New York from 1895 to 1949.

== History ==
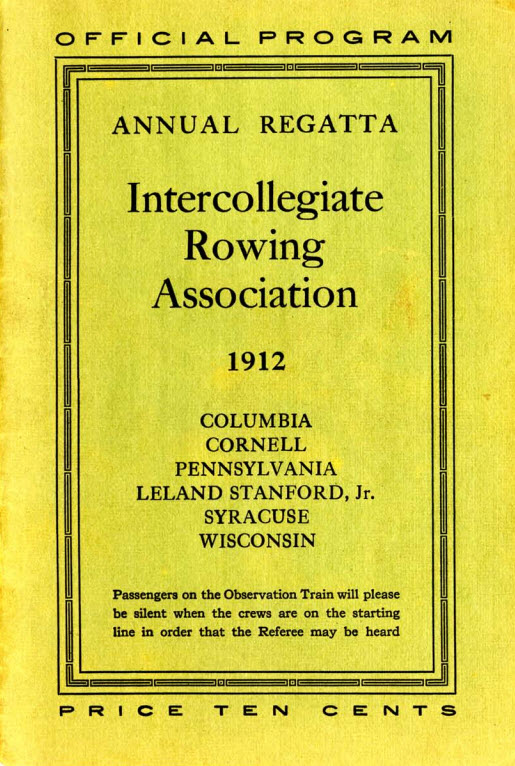
Program Cover of the 1912 Poughkeepsie Regatta

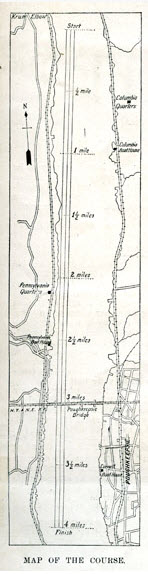
1895 course

The IRA was established by Cornell, Columbia, and Pennsylvania in 1891, the third year of their race on the Thames River in New London, Connecticut. There Harvard and Yale, from 1878, had established and maintained "The Race" as an exclusive head-to-head contest. The newly formed IRA "left New London in frustration and disgust" next year and selected a permanent site for its own annual regatta in June 1895.

The very first IRA race was held in June 1895, on the Hudson River at Poughkeepsie, with one Varsity Eight team from Cornell, Columbia and Pennsylvania competing. Cornell won with a time of 21:25.0. The course was a straight four miles, wide enough for 20 boats. In 1899 there were 48 cars in the observation train that slowly followed the race as "a moving grandstand" (on the heights above the river). People soon named the championship regatta after its permanent location and the name Poughkeepsie Regatta was used on the cover of the official program from 1922.

In the early years the Eastern schools dominated the race. Typically only a four-mile Varsity Eight race was held, but if there were enough teams entered, there was also a two-mile Freshman Eight race, and occasionally a Varsity Four race. Eventually, this evolved into a format that included an annual two-mile Freshman Eight race, followed by a three-mile Junior Varsity Eight race, and finally the four-mile Varsity Eight race. In 1923 the University of Washington became the first Western crew team to win the Poughkeepsie Regatta. From that year on the Western schools that participated, namely the University of Washington, and the University of California, became a dominating factor. They consistently placed in the top three, and more often than not, they won. The University of Washington became the first and only school to sweep the Regatta two years in a row.

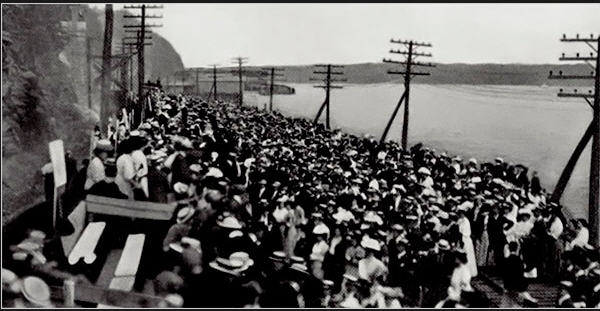
Spectators at the 1907 Poughkeepsie Regatta

The Regatta grew to be "the greatest one-day sporting event in America" early in the 20th century, the culmination of a "carnival" regatta week on both sides of the river. Every June tens of thousands of spectators would come pouring into Poughkeepsie to watch the races. They covered the shores next to the river, many waiting all day, picnicking on blankets, to ensure they had a good view. The railroad tracks on the west side of the river had a flatbed train which held grandstands from which spectators could watch the race. As the crews rowed up the river, the train would keep pace with them, giving the people on board the best view possible. Hundreds of boats, yachts, and occasionally even Navy destroyers sailed to Poughkeepsie, and moored on the sides of the river to watch the event. The town of Poughkeepsie came alive on the day of the Regatta, with parades, bands, vendors, and banners. In addition, colorful pennants displaying the school colors of all the participants were flying everywhere. The Regatta was extensively covered by newspaper reporters, and as time went on it was even broadcast over local and national radio stations. But the crowds, the cheers, the reporters, parades, and pennants were not the reasons why the Regatta became so intensely popular, the explanation lay in the physical feats of the crew teams. To race at full-speed for four miles required such a breathtaking amount of strength, skill, and endurance that it was awe-inspiring to watch.

After 55 years, the IRA Championship Regatta moved in 1950 to Marietta, Ohio; in 1952 to Syracuse, New York; and in 1995 to Camden, New Jersey. Harvard and Yale remained self-segregated for a century, long after the IRA championship left Poughkeepsie and the Hudson River.

== Revival ==
The Hudson River Rowing Association "welcomed back" the Poughkeepsie Regatta in October 2008, running races in eight classifications on a 2.3-mile segment of the traditional course.

In October 2009, to celebrate the quadricentennial of Henry Hudson's exploration of the Hudson River, Marist College hosted a reenactment of the Poughkeepsie Regatta at Longview Park. 2009 competitors included Marist, Columbia, Cornell, Navy, Pennsylvania, Syracuse, Army, and Vassar College. There was a repeat in 2010 and a cancellation caused by foul weather in 2011. The September 2012 rendition was called "annual" by Marist.
