= Intercollegiate Rowing Association =

American governing body for intercollegiate rowing

- Abbreviation: IRA
- Founded: October 31, 1891
- Founders: Columbia, Cornell, Pennsylvania
- Founded at: Fifth Avenue Hotel
- Legal status: Association
- Website: irarowing.com

The Intercollegiate Rowing Association (IRA) governs intercollegiate rowing between varsity men's heavyweight, men's lightweight, and women's lightweight rowing programs across the United States, while the NCAA fulfills this role for women's open weight rowing. It is the direct successor to the Rowing Association of American Colleges, the first collegiate athletic organization in the United States, which operated from 1870–1894.

The IRA was founded by Cornell, Columbia, and Penn in 1891 and its first annual regatta was hosted on June 24, 1895. Today, Navy and Syracuse are also part of the association. Each year these five schools choose whom to invite to the IRA National Championship Regatta and are responsible for its organization.

The IRA runs the IRA National Championship Regatta, which since 1895 has been considered to be the United States collegiate national championship of men's rowing. This regatta today includes both men's and women's (lightweight) events for 8- and 4-oared sweep boats with coxswains and a women's lightweight double scull (two-oars for each rower) event.

The IRA National Championship is the oldest college rowing championship in the United States.

== History ==
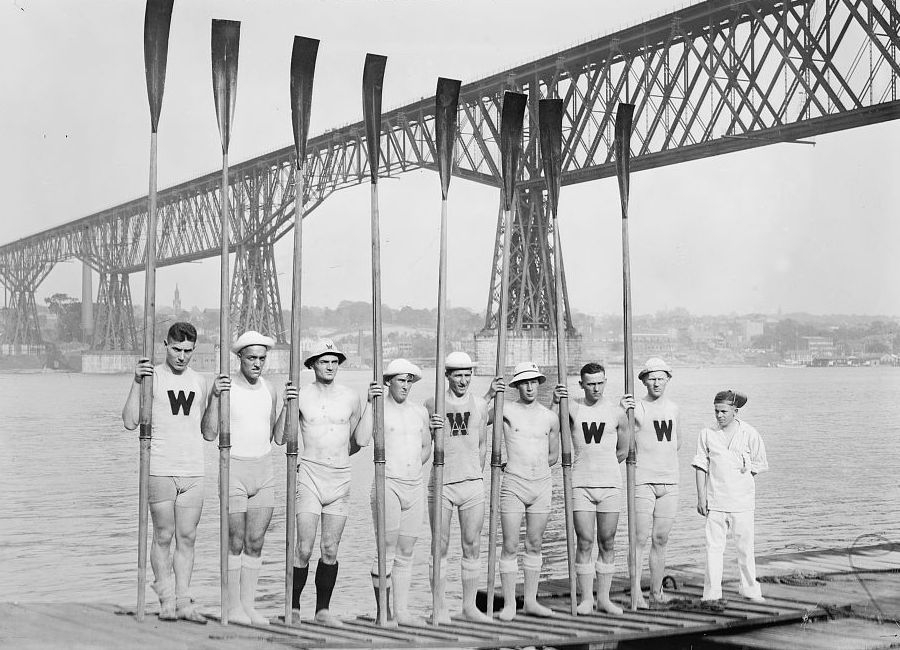
The University of Wisconsin varsity sport rowing team competing in the Intercollegiate Rowing Association regatta on June 11, 1914 at the Poughkeepsie Bridge.

Columbia, Cornell and Pennsylvania were the organizing stewards of the Poughkeepsie Regatta, the IRA Championship until 1949. The first edition was held on the Hudson River at Poughkeepsie, New York, on June 24, 1895.

The format through 1967 with the exception of 1964 was to line all the entries in the race onto stake-boats and fire a shotgun for the start. In the last race of this format in 1967 on Onondaga Lake, in Syracuse, New York, 16 varsity crews waited for the gun to begin their three-mile race—winner take all.

The format was changed in the Olympic year, 1968, to heats and finals over a 2,000-meter, six-lane course. This heat-rep-final, six-lane, 2,000 meter format continues today.

Since the 1920s, when the West Coast crews—notably California and Washington—began to attend and regularly win, the Intercollegiate Rowing Association's championship (known as the IRA) has been considered the national championship for collegiate rowing. Two important crews, Harvard and Yale, however, did not participate in the heavyweight divisions of the event for a lengthy period. (After losing to Cornell in 1897, Harvard and Yale chose to avoid the IRA, so as not to diminish the Harvard–Yale Regatta. The IRA championship was held each year preceding that regatta, which Harvard and Yale considered more important to their schools and alumni than the IRA event. It soon became part of each school's tradition not to participate.) Beginning in 1973, Washington decided to skip the IRA because a change in schedule conflicted with its finals. Washington, however, returned to the regatta in 1995.

From 1982 to 1996, another event, the Cincinnati Regatta (which renamed itself the National Collegiate Rowing Championship), was held in Cincinnati with funding from a benefactor. It was viewed by some crews as an additional, quasi-championship, as the field included Harvard and Yale, as well as medalists from the IRA regatta, Pac-10 and Eastern Sprints. In 2003, after an absence of over one hundred years, Harvard and Yale decided to participate in the IRA championship.

Before 2006, some competitive club rowing programs, which receive little or no funding from their university athletic departments, were invited to the IRA Championship. In 2006, Rutgers University cut funding from its men's rowing program, reducing it to "club" status. Part of Rutger's justification for cutting rowing was that clubs could compete equally with funded programs at the IRA Championships. To avoid other members from losing funding, the IRA excluded clubs from competing at its championship beginning in 2007, leading to the creation of the American Collegiate Rowing Association for clubs.

The IRA regatta was cancelled in 2020 due to the COVID-19 pandemic.

== Champions ==
=== Varsity Heavyweight Eights ===
Men

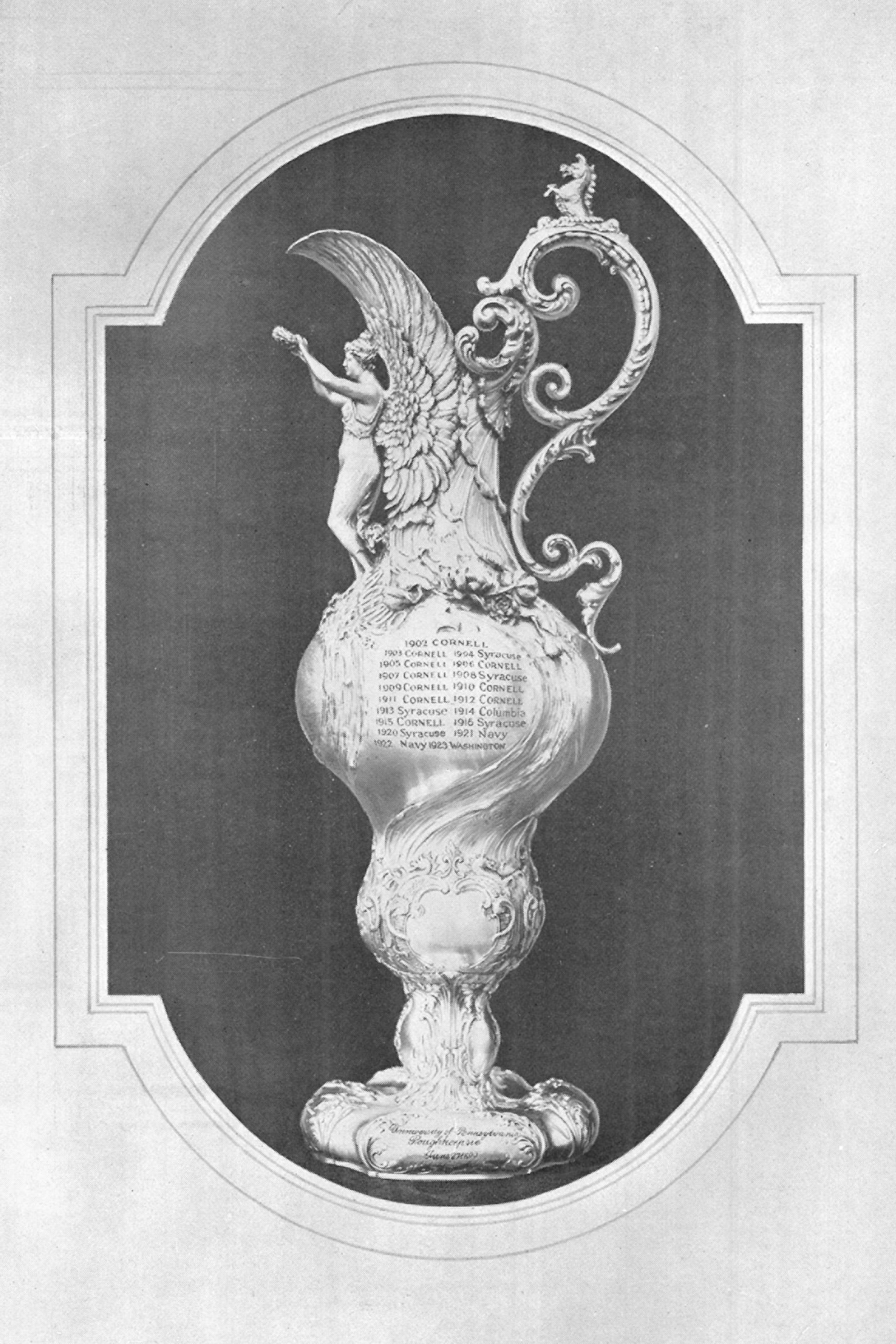
Varsity Challenge Cup as won by Washington at the 1923 Poughkeepsie Regatta.

Year and Champion	Year and Champion	Year and Champion	Year and Champion	Year and Champion	Year and Champion	Year and Champion
1895 Columbia	1913 Syracuse	1932 California	1951 Wisconsin	1970 Washington	1989 Pennsylvania	2008 Wisconsin
1896 Cornell	1914 Columbia	1933 - not held *	1952 Navy	1971 Cornell	1990 Wisconsin	2009 Washington
1897 (a) Cornell	1915 Cornell	1934 California	1953 Navy	1972 Pennsylvania	1991 Northeastern	2010 California
1897 (b) Cornell	1916 Syracuse	1935 California	1954 Winner disqualified †	1973 Wisconsin	1992 Dartmouth, Navy, Penn (tie)	2011 Washington
1898 Pennsylvania	1917 - not held	1936 Washington	1955 Cornell	1974 Wisconsin	1993 Brown	2012 Washington
1899 Pennsylvania	1918 - not held	1937 Washington	1956 Cornell	1975 Wisconsin	1994 Brown	2013 Washington
1900 Pennsylvania	1919 - not held	1938 Navy	1957 Cornell	1976 California	1995 Brown	2014 Washington
1901 Cornell	1920 Syracuse	1939 California	1958 Cornell	1977 Cornell	1996 Princeton	2015 Washington
1902 Cornell	1921 Navy	1940 Washington	1959 Wisconsin	1978 Syracuse	1997 Washington	2016 California
1903 Cornell	1922 Navy	1941 Washington	1960 California	1979 Brown	1998 Princeton	2017 Yale
1904 Syracuse	1923 Washington	1942 - not held	1961 California	1980 Navy	1999 California	2018 Yale
1905 Cornell	1924 Washington	1943 - not held	1962 Cornell	1981 Cornell	2000 California	2019 Yale
1906 Cornell	1925 Navy	1944 - not held	1963 Cornell	1982 Cornell	2001 California	2020 - not held
1907 Cornell	1926 Washington	1945 - not held	1964 California	1983 Brown	2002 California	2021 Washington
1908 Syracuse	1927 Columbia	1946 - not held	1965 Navy	1984 Navy	2003 Harvard	2022 California
1909 Cornell	1928 California	1947 Navy	1966 Wisconsin	1985 Princeton	2004 Harvard	2023 California
1910 Cornell	1929 Columbia	1948 Washington	1967 Pennsylvania	1986 Brown	2005 Harvard	2024 Washington
1911 Cornell	1930 Cornell	1949 California	1968 Pennsylvania	1987 Brown	2006 California	2025 Washington
1912 Cornell	1931 Navy	1950 Washington	1969 Pennsylvania	1988 Northeastern	2007 Washington	2026 Washington

* Not held in 1933 due to the Depression. However, the first college 2000-meter national championship ever held was conducted by local businessmen in Long Beach, California, as a substitute. Washington raced both Harvard and Yale for the first time at this event and defeated Yale by eight lengths to win the championship. Washington counts this victory among its string of Men’s National Varsity Eight Championships.

† Navy was disqualified from the 1954 IRA Regatta for use of an ineligible coxswain. Trophies won by Navy were forfeited and not awarded. Cornell finished second.

=== Number of Intercollegiate Rowing Association Championships: Men's Varsity Heavyweight Eights ===
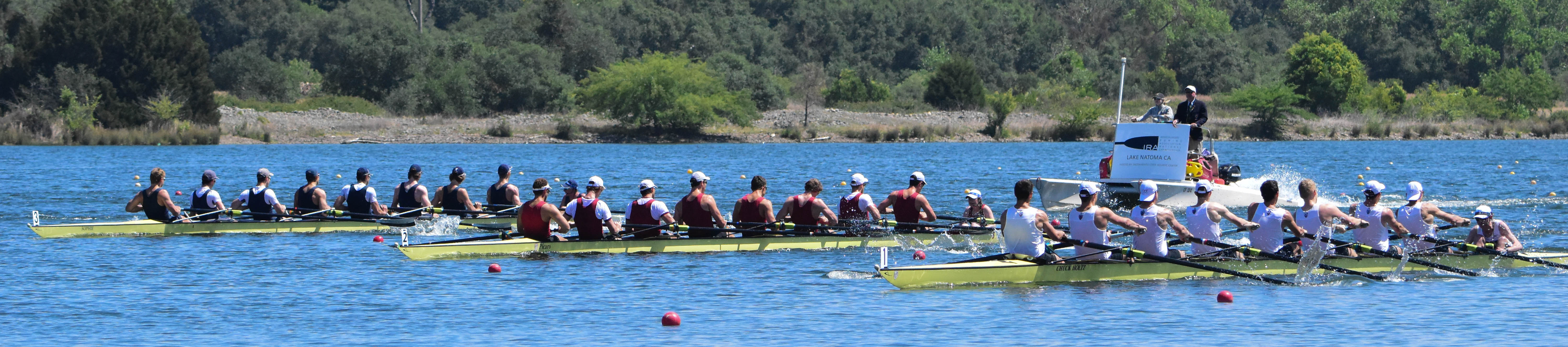
An IRA race in 2017

1 Cornell University (26 championships)

2 University of Washington (22 championships)

3 University of California - Berkeley (19 championships)

4 US Naval Academy (12 championships)

5 University of Pennsylvania (12 championships)

6 University of Wisconsin - Madison (12 championships)

7 Brown University (7 championships)

8 Syracuse University (6 championships)

9 Columbia University (4 championships)

10 Princeton University (3 championships)

10 Harvard University (3 championships)

10 Yale University (3 championships)

13 Northeastern University (2 championships)

14 Dartmouth College (1 championship)

=== Ten Eyck Trophy ===
The Jim Ten Eyck Memorial Trophy is awarded to the school amassing the most overall points in a system based on the finishing places of three heavyweight eights crews. From 1952 through 1973, the winning team was the one with the most points in the varsity, junior varsity and freshman eights. Starting in 1974, all races counted in the scoring under a system adopted by the coaches of the Eastern Association of Rowing Colleges. More recently, the scoring system was revised to include only three of the four possible eights from each school in the points standings.

== See also ==
- For collegiate rowing champions (U.S.), see: Intercollegiate sports team champions#Rowing
- For IRA "men's varsity heavyweight eights" champions (1895–present), see: Intercollegiate sports team champions#Varsity Openweight Eights
- For IRA "men's varsity lightweight eights" champions (1988–present), see: Intercollegiate sports team champions#Varsity Lightweight Eights
- For IRA "men's overall points" champions (1952–present), see: Intercollegiate sports team champions#Overall Points
- For IRA "women's varsity lightweight eights" champions (1997–present), see: Intercollegiate sports team champions#Varsity Lightweight Eights
- For IRA "men's varsity lightweight fours" champions (2011–present), see: Intercollegiate sports team champions#Lightweight Fours.2FPairs
- For IRA "women's varsity lightweight fours" champions (2007–present), see: Intercollegiate sports team champions#Lightweight Fours.2FPairs
