= Eastern Sprints =

Annual American rowing championship

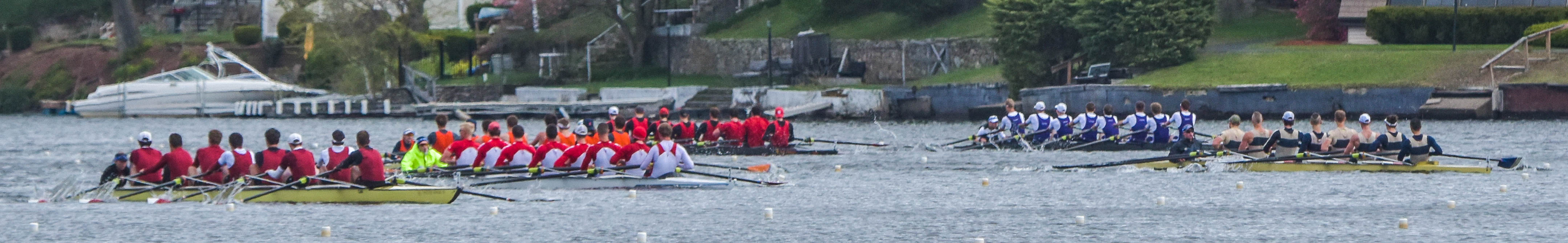
A race of the 2016 regatta

The Eastern Sprints is the annual rowing championship for the men's Eastern Association of Rowing Colleges (EARC) in Northeast USA.

== Participants ==
The teams include all of the Ivy League schools as well as others such as Georgetown University, Syracuse University, U.S. Naval Academy, BU, Northeastern, and Wisconsin. In the fall of 2006, The George Washington University and The College of the Holy Cross were given a two-year provisional bid to join the league; both schools became full members of the league. Several members have since left the league, including Rutgers University and George Washington University.

Full Members of the Eastern Association of Rowing Colleges

Institution	Location	Type	Endowment (millions)	Nickname	Colors	Blade
Boston University	Boston, Massachusetts	Private	$3.2 billion (2023)	Terriers		
Brown University	Providence, Rhode Island	Private	$6.6 billion (2023)	Bears		Brown University
Columbia University	New York, New York	Private	$13.6 billion (2023)	Lions		Columbia University
Cornell University	Ithaca, New York	Private	$10.0 billion (2023)	Big Red		Cornell University
Dartmouth College	Hanover, New Hampshire	Private	$8.5 billion (2021)	Big Green		Dartmouth College
Georgetown University	Washington, D.C.	Private	$3.3 billion (2023)	Hoyas		Georgetown University
Harvard University	Cambridge, Massachusetts	Private	$50.7 billion (2023)	Crimson		Harvard University
College of the Holy Cross	Worcester, Massachusetts	Private	$1.27 billion (2022)	Crusaders		
Massachusetts Institute of Technology	Cambridge, Massachusetts	Private	$27.4 billion (2025)	Engineers		Massachusetts Institute of Technology
United States Naval Academy	Annapolis, Maryland	Public	N/A	Midshipmen		
Northeastern University	Boston, Massachusetts	Private	$1.3 billion (2022)	Huskies		
University of Pennsylvania	Philadelphia, Pennsylvania	Private	$21.0 billion (2023)	Quakers		University of Pennsylvania
Princeton University	Princeton, New Jersey	Private	$35.8 billion (2022)	Tigers		Princeton University
Syracuse University	Syracuse, New York	Private	$1.9 billion (2023)	Orange		Syracuse University
University of Wisconsin–Madison	Madison, Wisconsin	Public	$4.0 billion (2022)	Badgers		Wisconsin Badgers Crew
Yale University	New Haven, Connecticut	Private	$54.7 billion (2023)	Bulldogs		Yale University

Former Members

Institution	Location	Type	Endowment (millions)	Nickname	Colors
George Washington University	Washington, D.C.	Private	$2.6 billion (2023)	Revolutionaries	
Rutgers University	New Brunswick, New Jersey	Public	$1.98 billion (2022)	Scarlet Knights	

== Location ==
The race is held at Regatta Point on Lake Quinsigamond in Worcester, MA in mid to late May. In general, crews compete in a trial heat in the morning, followed by a final (grand, petite, or 3rd level) in the afternoon. Each race is a 2000m race including up to six crews.

== Team cups ==
Since 1946, the Rowe Cup has been awarded to the college whose heavyweight men's crews score the highest combined total number of points in the varsity, junior varsity, and freshman races. Harvard has won the cup the most number of times (27). Princeton has the 2nd most Rowe Cup victories with 9 (1995, 1996, 1997, 1998, 1999, 2001, 2005, 2015, 2016).

Since 1961, the Jope Cup has been awarded to the college whose lightweight men's crews score the highest combined total number of points in the varsity, junior varsity, and freshman races. Harvard has won the cup 22 times. Princeton has won 15 times. The current holder is the University of Pennsylvania, coached by Colin Farrell.

Since 2009, the Joke Cup has been awarded to the college whose fourth varsity lightweight men's crew won its race at Eastern Sprints. The Joke Cup is a reward for the fourth varsity non-Jope Cup qualifying crew that performs the best at the Sprints. It is awarded in secret, given from crew to crew at an undisclosed location. Harvard won the Joke Cup in its inaugural year, 2009. Yale won the cup in 2011, Cornell in 2010, 2012, and 2015. Navy in 2013, and Columbia in 2014. After the third varsity eight became a Jope Cup event for the Kilpatrick Trophy in 2015, the Joke Cup is now passed between fourth varsity eights.

== Course records ==
Boat	Time	School	Year	Event
Heavyweight Varsity 8+	5:23.619	Yale	2023	Grand Final
Lightweight Varsity 8+	5:34.170	Penn	2024	Heat 2
Second Varsity Heavyweight 8+	5:33.357	Harvard	2024	Heat 2
Second Varsity Lightweight 8+	5:40.765	Harvard	2023	Heat 2
Third Varsity Heavyweight 8+	5:37.222	Yale	2023	Grand Final
Third Varsity Lightweight 8+	5:46.708	Cornell	2023	Heat 1
Freshman Heavyweight 8+	5:35.980	Harvard	2001	Grand Final
Freshman Lightweight 8+	5:43.727	Penn	2014	Final
Fourth Varsity Heavyweight 8+	5:38.913	Harvard	2023	Grand Final
Fourth Varsity Lightweight 8+	5:53.769	Cornell	2023	Grand Final
Fifth Varsity Heavyweight 8+	5:40.079	Dartmouth	2023	Grand Final
Fifth Varsity Lightweight 8+	5:50.360	Navy	2023	Grand Final

== EARC Varsity Heavyweight 8 Winners ==
=== Overall ranking ===
Rank	University	Times Won
1.	Harvard	29
2.	Yale	13.5
3.	Brown	8
4.	Penn	5.5
5.	Navy	5
5.	Princeton	5
7.	Cornell	4
8.	Wisconsin	3
9.	Northeastern	2
10.	Dartmouth	1
10.	MIT	1

=== Winners by year ===
Year	Winner
1946	Wisconsin
1947	Harvard
1948	Harvard
1949	Harvard
1950	MIT
1951	Yale
1952	Navy
1953	Navy
1954	Navy
1955	Penn
1956	Cornell
1957	Cornell
1958	Yale
1959	Harvard
1960	Cornell
1961	Navy
1962	Penn/Yale
1963	Cornell
1964	Harvard
1965	Harvard
1966	Harvard
1967	Harvard
1968	Harvard
1969	Harvard
1970	Harvard
1971	Navy
1972	Northeastern
1973	Northeastern
1974	Harvard
1975	Harvard
1976	Harvard
1977	Harvard
1978	Yale
1979	Yale
1980	Harvard
1981	Yale
1982	Yale
1983	Harvard
1984	Brown
1985	Harvard
1986	Penn
1987	Brown
1988	Harvard
1989	Harvard
1990	Harvard
1991	Penn
1992	Dartmouth
1993	Brown
1994	Brown
1995	Princeton
1996	Penn
1997	Princeton
1998	Penn
1999	Princeton
2000	Brown
2001	Princeton
2002	Wisconsin
2003	Harvard
2004	Harvard
2005	Harvard
2006	Princeton
2007	Harvard
2008	Wisconsin
2009	Brown
2010	Harvard
2011	Harvard
2012	Brown
2013	Harvard
2014	Harvard
2015	Yale
2016	Yale
2017	Yale
2018	Yale
2019	Yale
2020	No Race
2021	No Race
2022	Yale
2023	Yale
2024	Brown

== EARC Varsity Lightweight 8 Winners ==
=== Overall ranking ===
Rank	University	Times Won
1.	Harvard	28
2.	Princeton	16
3.	Cornell	11.3
4.	Yale	9
5.	Penn	5
6.	Dartmouth	3
7.	Columbia	2
9.	Navy	1.3
9.	MIT	1.3

=== Medals by Year ===
1946-1994	Gold
1946	Harvard
1947	Harvard
1948	Princeton
1949	Cornell
1950	Yale
1951	Penn
1952	Penn
1953	Princeton
1954	MIT
1955	Penn
1956	Princeton
1957	Princeton
1958	Harvard
1959	Harvard
1960	Harvard
1961	Harvard
1962	Cornell-MIT-Navy
1963	Cornell
1964	Cornell
1965	Cornell
1966	Harvard
1967	Cornell
1968	Harvard
1969	Harvard
1970	Harvard
1971	Harvard
1972	Harvard
1973	Princeton
1974	Harvard
1975	Harvard
1976	Penn
1977	Harvard
1978	Harvard
1979	Yale
1980	Harvard
1981	Princeton
1982	Harvard
1983	Princeton
1984	Yale
1985	Princeton
1986	Princeton
1987	Yale
1988	Harvard
1989	Harvard
1990	Yale
1991	Harvard
1992	Cornell
1993	Dartmouth
1994	Dartmouth

1995-2024	Gold	Silver	Bronze
1995	Harvard	Yale	Princeton
1996	Princeton	Harvard	Yale
1997	Harvard	Yale	Princeton
1998	Princeton	Harvard	Yale
1999	Princeton	Columbia	Harvard
2000	Columbia	Yale	Harvard
2001	Yale	Dartmouth	Harvard
2002	Yale	Princeton	Cornell
2003	Princeton	Columbia	Yale
2004	Navy	Harvard	Georgetown
2005	Harvard	Yale	Cornell
2006	Cornell	Navy	Yale
2007	Dartmouth	Cornell	Princeton
2008	Cornell	Princeton	Yale
2009	Princeton	Harvard	Georgetown
2010	Princeton	Harvard	Yale
2011	Harvard	Dartmouth	Yale
2012	Harvard	Dartmouth	Princeton
2013	Harvard	Yale	Dartmouth
2014	Cornell	Yale	Princeton
2015	Cornell	Columbia	Princeton
2016	Yale	Columbia	Princeton
2017	Cornell	Harvard	Pennsylvania
2018	Columbia	Princeton	Pennsylvania
2019	Pennsylvania	Yale	Navy
2020	No Race	No Race	No Race
2021	No Race	No Race	No Race
2022	Yale	Navy	Georgetown
2023	Princeton	Harvard	Navy
2024	Harvard	Pennsylvania	Princeton

== See also ==
- National Collegiate Rowing Championship
