= Edwin Sweetland =

American coach, trainer, and athletic administrator

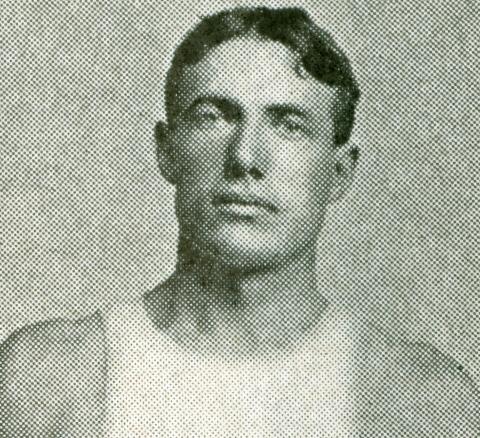
- Sweetland in 1898

Biographical details
- Born: January 10, 1875; Dryden, New York, U.S.
- Died: October 21, 1950 (aged 75); Dryden, New York, U.S.

Playing career

Football
- 1894: Union (NY)
- 1895–1896: Cornell
- 1898: Cornell

Rowing
- 1898–1899: Cornell
- Positions: Guard, tackle (football); No. 5 (rowing)

Coaching career (HC unless noted)

Football
- 1899: Hamilton
- 1900–1902: Syracuse
- 1903: Hamilton
- 1904–1905: Ohio State
- 1908: Colgate
- 1909–1910: Kentucky State College
- 1911: Miami (OH)
- 1912: Kentucky State College
- 1913: West Virginia
- 1914: Tulane
- 1915–1917: Alfred
- 1919: Alfred

Basketball
- 1909–1910: Kentucky State College
- 1911–1912: Kentucky State College
- 1914–1915: Tulane

Track
- 1905: Ohio State
- 1907: Colgate
- 1915: Tulane

Rowing
- 1901–1902: Syracuse

Administrative career (AD unless noted)
- 1912–1913: Kentucky State College
- 1913–1914: West Virginia

Head coaching record
- Overall: 100–41–10 (football); 15–11 (basketball)

Accomplishments and honors

Awards
- Third-team All-American (1898)

Edwin Regur Sweetland (January 10, 1875 – October 21, 1950) was an American coach, trainer, and athletic administrator at several universities. During his coaching career he was head coach of many sports including basketball, track and field, and rowing, but the majority of for his coaching work was in football. Though mainly known for football, he left his mark on several college athletics departments and other sports. This includes being the first athletic trainer at Ohio State University, the first paid coach of the Kentucky Wildcats men's basketball team, and the first coach of Syracuse University rowing team.

Sweetland attended Union College and graduated from Cornell University in 1899. A gifted athlete, Sweetland was on the varsity football team at Union and Cornell and the varsity rowing team at Cornell. At Cornell he was coached by Hall of Fame coaches Pop Warner in football and Charles E. Courtney in rowing.

== Early life and family ==
Sweetland was born to George Sweetland and Hannah Marsh Sweetland on January 10, 1875, in Dryden, New York. He had several brothers and sisters. One of his brothers was Monroe Marsh Sweetland, who founded Delta Chi fraternity while a law student at Cornell University. Another brother, Dr. George James Sweetland, was captain of the Union College football team in 1895 and later the athletic director and head football coach at University of North Dakota.

== College ==
After attending Union College for one year, Sweetland transferred to Cornell University, where he graduated in 1899 with a Bachelor of Science degree in agriculture. At Cornell, he was member of Phi Gamma Delta and the Sphinx Head Society. A talented athlete, Sweetland rowed on the varsity crew team, and played tackle on the football team at Cornell. Sweetland was a considered one of the top players in the early years of Big Red football. The Sun named Sweetland to the second team of the all-time Cornell football team in an article on January 29, 1927.

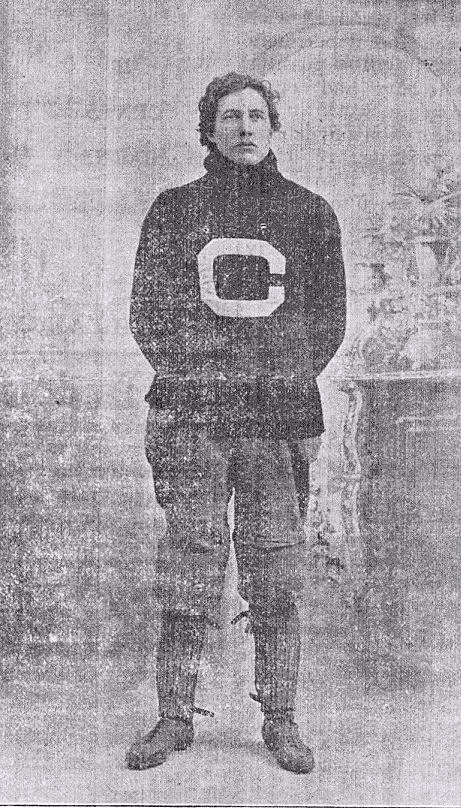
E. R. Sweetland in his Cornell letterman sweater, c. 1898–99

=== Football career ===
Sweetland began his college football career in 1894. "Sweet" as he was nicknamed, played guard for Union College along with his brother, George. He transferred to Cornell for the 1895 season where he moved to tackle under coach Marshall Newell and helped the school to a 3–4–1 record. That year, Sweetland was part of the line that helped Clint Wyckoff become Cornell's first College Football All-American. The following year, Cornell changed coaches replacing Newell with Joseph Beacham. Sweetland helped the Beacham lead the squad to a record of 5–3–1. In 1897, Pop Warner took over as head coach. Sweetland could not play for Warner in the 1897 season. During the offseason he went through surgery and his doctors would not allow him to play. When practice started for the 1898 season, Warner had to replace many starters including the previous year's captain, William McKeever. Sweetland returned to the line in 1898. With Sweetland's help, the team won 10 of their first 11 games, setting up a big game for Cornell against national power Penn in the final game of the season. Sweetland helped Cornell take a 6–0 lead before halftime. He broke through Penn's line blocking a kick and recovered the ball for a touchdown, but Penn came back and won by a score of 12–6. With the Penn loss, the team finished the season 10–2, outscoring their opponents by a score of 296–29. After the season, he was named 3rd team All-America by Walter Camp.

Sweetland planned to the return for the 1899 football season even though he would be graduating. He planned to start his medical training at Cornell. After the 1898 season he became involved in a controversy between two factions on the future direction of the football program that came to the head with the election of captain for the 1899 season. Originally a three-year starter at left guard, Daniel A. Reed was elected captain over Sweetland for the 1899 season. A very close election caused a rift in the football team. Reed won by a vote of ten to nine. Later Reed resigned as captain and the team elected Sweetland unanimously. The Cornell Athletic Council refused to ratify the election of Sweetland, stating that their decision was "in the interest of harmony among the various elements who co-operation is necessary for the success of Cornell athletics." The council statement listed two specific reasons. The first was that the Council wanted to purge all leaders of the competing factional rivalries on the team. This included coach Warner and Tom Fennell as well as Daniel A. Reed. All three stated they would not return for the 1899 season. The second reason was a large number of football alumni protested the election of Sweetland as captain. Additionally, a charge was leveled that Sweetland was a professional, not an amateur, since he was paid for playing football for Elmira Athletic Club in the fall of 1897. Sweetland denied the allegation only admitting that he received reimbursement for his expenses but not for playing. After the Athletic Council ruling the team elected fullback Raymond Starbuck as team captain.

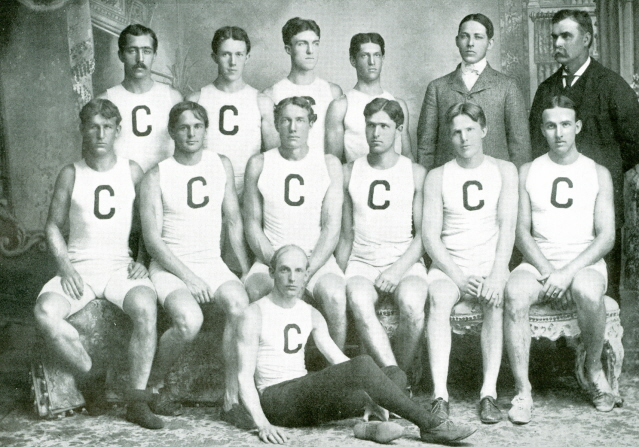
1899 Cornell Varsity Rowing Team: E. R. Sweetland is third from the left in the middle row

=== Varsity rower ===
Sweetland was a member of the varsity crew at Cornell in 1898 and 1899 under coach Charles E. Courtney. In 1897, as a novice rower, Sweetland went out for Cornell rowing team but did not make varsity. Early on he was mentioned as a possible varsity rower at the No. 5 position. He had to go against more experienced rowers including E. J. Savage, who rowed varsity in 1896 and Edgar Johnston, who rowed varsity in 1895. Sweetland had trouble throughout the season. First he was thrown out of his boat when he wrecked his shell upon a snag. He also had to spend several days in the hospital due to trouble with his appendicitis. In 1898 he was a substitute on team that finished second in Intercollegiate Rowing Association Regatta at Saratoga Lake. The following year, he rowed in the No. 5 position that finished third in the Intercollegiate Rowing Association Regatta at Poughkeepsie, New York. In that race, the Cornell crew had the slight advantage holding the outer course but lost to the University of Pennsylvania coached by Ellis Ward. The University of Wisconsin–Madison using a modified English stroke started quickly and held a lead at the mile and half marker but lost the lead to Penn due to bad steering. Penn finished strong using a stroke that depended on leg drive over the catch. This gave the boat a slight amount of checking between strokes. Sweetland and the Cornell crew were unable to catch Penn and finished three and a half lengths behind. They were also unable to catch Wisconsin and finished varsity race in third place.

== College coaching career ==
Sweetland started coaching football the fall after he graduated from Cornell. He would coach college sports for the next twenty years with all but two as a head coach. As a football coach he finished with a record of 100–41–10. His coaching career allowed Sweetland earn several advance degrees at the schools he coached, including a Ph.M. in Sociology from Syracuse and LL.B and LL.M from the University of Kentucky.

=== Hamilton ===
After graduation, Sweetland took his first coaching job as the head football coach at Hamilton College in nearby Clinton, New York. In his first season as a head coach, he led the 1899 squad to an 8–2–1 record. That year Hamilton played a then school-record 11 games. One of the two losses came at the hands of the Carlisle Indians, coached by his former coach Pop Warner, and the other loss to Sweetland's alma mater, Cornell. He left for Syracuse University after the season.

=== Syracuse ===
On January 3, 1900, Sweetland was picked to be the head football coach at Syracuse University. A month later, on February 6, 1900, Sweetland agreed to also become Syracuse's rowing coach. Even though rowing had some history at the university since 1873, including hosting professional crew races on Onondaga Lake, Sweetland became their first Intercollegiate coach. Chancellor James Roscoe Day assisted the rowing team that year by persuading Lyman Cornelius Smith to donate equipment.

In Sweetland's first year as coach of the rowing team, he was basically starting the rowing team from scratch. He spent a good amount of time on basic watermanship and maintaining an even keel. He started practice in late March and was able to get the team ready for a race against the Francis Club Crew of Cornell in June. A crowd of 3000 showed up at Onondaga Lake to watch the 2-mile (3.2 km) race in which Sweetland's varsity crew lost by six seconds.

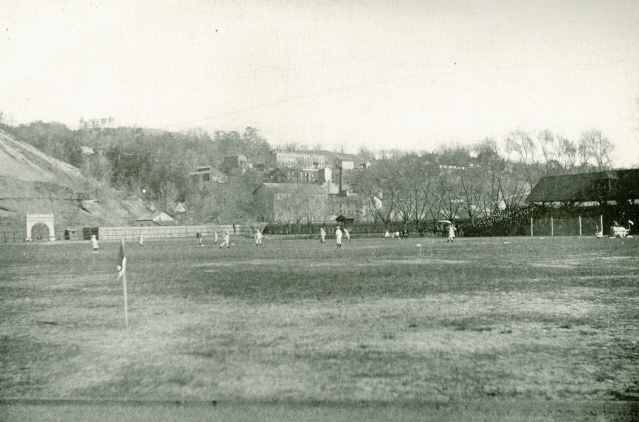
Cornell University's Percy Field c. 1905. Sweetland played football on this field as a student at Cornell as well as coached against his former school while coach of Hamilton and Syracuse.

In fall of that year, Sweetland began football practice on September 4, 1900, with 10 returning players from the 1899 team. His team finished the season with a 7–2–1 record including victories over Amherst and Oberlin. One of his losses was to his former school, Cornell by a score of 6–0. Syracuse coming into the game did have several advantages that made their fans optimistic that the Orange could pull out a victory. First the game was being played early in the season, September, 29th. The Orangemen had been practicing for several weeks longer than Cornell. The second benefit was a large crowd of Syracuse rooters attended the game. Even with the game being played at Cornell's Percy Field, Syracuse rooters filled half the grand stand and part of the bleachers. The third advantage was that Cornell's captain, Raymond Starbuck, had been hurt earlier in practice and could not play. Sweetland's team started out strongly and had several opportunities to score. Early in the game, after stopping Cornell on their first possession, Syracuse drove the ball into scoring position at the Cornell's 15 yard line but could not score. Later, just before half time, Cornell returned a fumble to the Syracuse's seven yard line but Sweetland's defence stopped them from scoring and took over on downs. Then in Syracuse's next possession, Carr, Syracuse's half-back, went through a hole in the Cornell line and ran seventy yards before Cornell's halfback A. B. Morrison caught him to prevent a touchdown. The game remained tied until about two minutes to play when Cornell's Morrison ran 25 yards for a touchdown. After the game Cornell accused Coach Sweetland's team of rough and dirty play.

Sweetland again coached the rowing team for the 1901 season. The Syracuse crew took part in a regatta on Onondaga Lake on June 7, 1901. Sweetland's varsity eight again raced against the Francis Club crew of Cornell and lost by 1/4 of a boat length. They raced in spite of the fact that Sweetland was in the hospital suffering from an attack of typhoid fever just a few weeks before the race. The season ended with his team rowing in the Intercollegiate Rowing Association Regatta in Poughkeepsie, New York. This was the first time in school history that Syracuse attend this event. Sweetland's varsity eight finished fifth out of six teams. Cornell finished first, but the Orangemen were able to beat University of Pennsylvania coached by Ellis Ward.

Controversy erupted before the start of the 1901 football season. Cornell refused to play Syracuse because of bad feeling about rough play from the year before. They also questioned the amateur status of the Syracuse team. Syracuse stated that there were rules in force that prevented professional players but admitted that slight violations of the rules were possible. On the issue of rough play the year before, Syracuse investigated and found the accusation to be groundless. The Syracuse General Athletic Committee severed all athletic relations with their upstate New York rivals. The two schools would not play again until 1935. The team finished 7–1, with victories over Brown, Columbia, and Amherst, and outscored opponents 150 to 27. The New York Sun rated them the seventh-best team in the nation.

Sweetland returned for his third year as rowing coach in 1902. Before the season the outlook for Varsity crews at Syracuse looked to be good. Coach Sweetland had experienced rowers to choose the Varsity crew from. Most members of the 1901 Varsity and Freshmen crews returned for 1902. The team returned to Intercollegiate Rowing Association Regatta. Before the race Syracuse crew weight dropped to an average of less than 155 lb (70 kg). Sweetland had to reduce the training before the Regatta. In their second attempt, Syracuse finished fifth out of six teams beating Georgetown in the Varsity race. Cornell finished first followed by Wisconsin, Columbia and Penn. Even though this was the same place they finished the year before it was considered an improvement. The time of 19 minutes 31 seconds was the fastest time at that distance.

The 1903 football season under Coach Sweetland saw Syracuse outscore their opponents by a combined score of 153 to 87. The team finished the season with a record of 6–2–1. Wins included shutouts against Colgate and Amherst and disappointing lopsided losses to Army and Yale.

Before the 1903 rowing season, the Athletic Council replaced Sweetland with James A. Ten Eyck as rowing coach. Sweetland had demanded a higher salary to coach the rowing team. When his demands were not met he resigned from all athletic work at Syracuse. The rowing team threaten a revolt but no major action was taken. Even though they replaced him at rowing coach some in the council tried to retain him as football coach for the 1904 season. They were unsuccessful, with the full council deciding to go in a different direction. In the end Sweetland coached football for three years at Syracuse with a combined record of 20–5-2.

=== Return to Hamilton ===
Sweetland returned to Hamilton to coach the 1903 football team to a 6–3 record. During that season Hamilton football team ran into financial troubles and was unable to meet the financial offers from other institutions for Sweetland services and he left after the season. In statement released to the alumni, Hamilton stressed Sweetland unselfishness and dedication to the team. The release went on to state that "...his conduct on the football field, both in action and speech he was a perfect gentleman, and for this he was heartily admired by faculty and students."

=== Courtney and Cornell Athletic Council ===
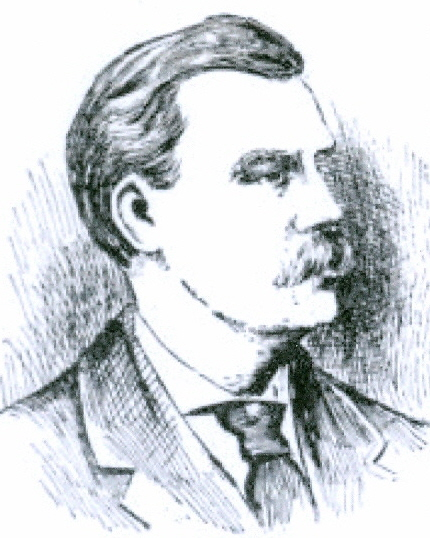
Charles Courtney, Cornell rowing coach

After leaving Hamilton, Sweetland considered an offer to be assistant rowing coach under his former mentor Coach Courtney at Cornell for the 1904 season. Courtney wanted Sweetland to replace F. D. Colson who moved on to become coach at Harvard. While negotiation were still pending, the Rowing Committee of the Cornell Athletic Council announced that they hired C. A. Lueder to the position. This caused a power struggle between Courtney and the Athletic Council for control of the rowing program. The conflict was resolved when the Rowing Committee canceled the job offer to Lueder. In addition, the Athletic Council limited their interference with the rowing team by giving Coach Courtney the power to pick member of the crew and designate the oarsmen position. However, Sweetland did not become Courtney's assistant because in the time it took resolve the conflict, he was offered and accepted the position as head football coach at Ohio State University. With Sweetland out of the picture, Courtney hired Lueder as his assistant rowing coach.

=== Ohio State ===
In 1904, Sweetland became the head football coach at Ohio State University, partly due to a strong recommendation from Walter Camp and beating out Albert Hernstein for the position. Hernstein would later replace him. In his first year, he led the Buckeyes to a 6–5 record. Of the five losses only one was an Ohio Athletic Conference rival, a close 4–2 decision to Oberlin. Expectations were high for the 1904 team. The athletic association purchased 1,500 additional bleacher seats for the east side of University Field, but, the team fell way short of all expectations and the expected crowds never materialized. Even with the disappointing season Sweetland's team accomplished a first in Ohio State football history. It was the first Buckeye team to cross the goal line against University of Michigan. The touchdown was scored by the Buckeye's when Bill Marquardt returned a fumble fifty yards. The next year, he and the Buckeyes improved to 8–2–2. This team did not give up any points in Ohio Athletic Conference games. They did have a 0–0 tie to Case Institute of Technology. Case won the conference due to the fact they played and won two more games in conference than the Buckeyes. The two losses that season were to future Big Ten Conference rivals University of Michigan (40–0) and Indiana University (11–0). Sweetland finished with a combined record of 14–7–2 in his two years as the Buckeyes head man.

Sweetland also served as trainer of Ohio State's athletic teams and coach of the Buckeye's track and field team starting in 1905 and again in 1906. He was the first "Trainer" at Ohio State University, filling a role approved by the Athletic Board in January 1904 and which he accepted in December 1904. While track coach, with a victory over Oberlin in a dual meet by a score of 52–33 the Buckeyes won the state championship for 1905. In the spring of 1906 he was accused of using "improper inducements" in securing players and was investigated by the university's Athletic Board who publicly exonerated him.

=== Colgate ===
After helping Pop Warner at Cornell as an alumni football coach, Sweetland returned to being a head coach in 1907 at Colgate University where he coached the track team. The team was successful in winning both triangular meets they entered including one against nearby rivals Hamilton and Rochester. He was then named head football coach for the 1908 season. Going into the season the team prospects were considered poor. Nine of the top 17 players from the previous season did not return including standouts Milton Proctor, Theodore Sprague, Joseph Kronenburg, and Arthur Clark. The only experience lineman, Evan Boardman, caught pneumonia before the season and missed several practices. The university's athletic department was not able to provide a training table for the team because of lack of funds. Sweetland also had to deal with a tough schedule that included Cornell, Brown, Army and Syracuse. Even with those obstacles Sweetland was able to guide Colgate to a winning record in his only season as the thirteenth coach of the Raiders. After getting shut out in three of the first four games of the season, the Raiders were able to turn the season around with a strong finish. The offense out-scored, Union, Syracuse and Hamilton by 53–4 in the last three games to secure a winning record. Though Sweetland was able to beat his former employer, Syracuse, he lost to his alma mater, Cornell, by a score of 9–0.

=== Kentucky ===
Sweetland left Colgate and was hired as head football coach at the University of Kentucky (known as Kentucky State University at the time) in the fall of 1909. Kentucky was able to hire him due to a financially successfully 1908 Thanksgiving game versus in-state rival Centre College, This game allowed them to afford "eastern" coach to lead the football team.

During the 1909 season, the Wildcats scored several notable victories including a 6–2 over the University of Illinois in Champaign-Urbana. The head of the military department at Kentucky, Commandant Corbusier, stated that the team "fought like Wildcats." Shortly after this, "Wildcats" became synonymous with the university and would eventually become the official nickname. Other victories that year included a shutout victory over the University of Tennessee Volunteers and a blow out of cross-town rival Transylvania College. The team finished the season with a 15–6 victory over Centre before 6,-000 fans to win the Kentucky Intercollegiate Athletic Association (KIAA) state title. The Sweetland-led Wildcats finished the year at 9–1 and outscored their opponents by a combined score of 261 to 29 with the only blemish being a 15–6 loss to North Carolina A&M. The gridiron success was more remarkable considering Sweetland became ill during the season and was feared that he could not continue to coach the football team. The local newspaper went so far to report that a replacement was selected.

In the fall of 1909, the faculty athletic senate voted to abolish the men's basketball at Kentucky due to a poor record and an overcrowded gym. As a reaction to this, the University of Kentucky students presented the board of trustees with a solution to the overcrowding. The plan was for a wooden floor and new lighting to be installed in the Armory. To address the poor record of the past teams Sweetland was named coach. This made him first paid coach in Kentucky's basketball history. Before this time the team only had managers. In his first year, the basketball team finished 4–8. R. E. Spahr assumed coaching duties during the season when Sweetland once again became ill.

Sweetland had recovered from his Illness to coach the 1910 football season. The season went well for the Wildcats as they won the first seven straight victories. Among their victims were the North Carolina, Tennessee and Tulane. The last two games of the season did not go the Wildcats way. Team traveled to St. Louis University in the eighth game and was shut out by a score of 9–0. Centre College beat Kentucky on Thanksgiving Day in the last game of the season by a score of 12–6. Sweetland's team had several costly fumbles to allow Centre to claim the State title. This game was marred by several controversies. The first was before the game A. H. Throckmorton of the Kentucky Intercollegiate Athletic Association (KIAA) ruled that several of Centre College players were not eligible to play because their educational background did not meet the minimum requirement set out by the KIAA. Centre played the players that KIAA stated that were ineligible in the game anyway. It did so since both Kentucky and Centre were also members of the Southern Intercollegiate Athletic Association (SIAA) who had not ruled on the players' eligibility. The second was due to a verbal argument before the game that escalated to a point that Centre stated it was fearful of UK's actions and also stated it would never play Kentucky again.

At the end of the season Sweetland's health once again began to fail. He submitted his resignation and accepted what he hoped would be a "less stressful job" as the University of Wisconsin–Madison rowing coach. By mid January, Sweetland, had to send word to University of Wisconsin–Madison Athletic Director George W. Ehler that he will be unable to continue his duties due to his ongoing illness.

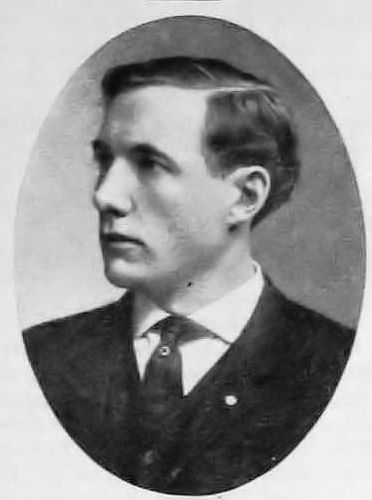
Edwin R. Sweetland while at Miami University

=== Miami ===
After leaving Kentucky, Sweetland wound up as head football coach at Miami University in Oxford, Ohio for the 1911 season. He replaced Harold Iddings, who ended up replacing Sweetland as head basketball coach at UK. After scoring a 46–0 victory over Wilmington, Miami's offense only scored 11 points and finished the season 2–4–2. One of his team's losses was to his former employer, the University of Kentucky by the score of 12–0. He returned to coach the Wildcats for the 1912 season. He was the last head coach to leave Miami with a losing record until 1989 when Tim Rose's contract was not renewed.

=== Return to Kentucky ===
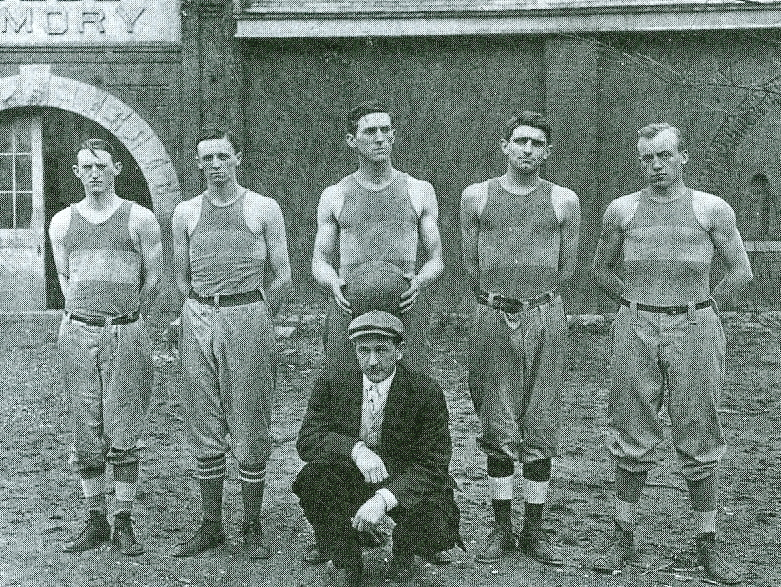
1911-12 UK Wildcat Basketball Team coached by E. R. Sweetland

Sweetland returned to the University of Kentucky in 1912 as part of an overall revamping of athletic programs by University President Henry Stites Barker. Barker created a position of athletic director to oversee all athletics and physical education. The position had the faculty status of a department chair. Baker hired Sweetland to fill this position, which included that he serve as both head coach of the football and basketball team.

The second edition of Sweetland basketball team at Kentucky was more successful than his first. His second stint as head basketball coach went better than his first. The Wildcats posted an undefeated season with a record of 9–0.

Even with the success on the hard court Sweetland's return was marred by several problems and troubles. Sweetland had to deal with disciplinary action by KIAA who had been investigating the use of ineligible athletes. Sweetland announced that Kentucky would leave the KIAA after the end of the academic year. Even with this announcement the KIAA suspended the Wildcats for one year. This caused Sweetland several problems including putting together a schedule for the 1912 football season. Most games had to be filled with schools from outside the state with emphasis put on games with fellow SIAA schools. Rumors that the KIAA had informed the SIAA of its findings plus strong criticism from the faculty council, most notably the dean of the engineering department, Paul Anderson were ongoing issues that Sweetland had to deal with.

The 1912 Wildcats posted a 7–2 record, losing only to Sweetland's former school, Miami University, by a score of 13–8 and VMI by a score of 3–2. During the season, Sweetland had to fire his assistant coach Richard S. Webb after he took several team members to a Knoxville Red-light district after the football game versus the University of Tennessee.

Near the end of the season a fire broke out in the on-campus office of Athletic Department critic Paul Anderson. The fire caused little damage to the building but destroyed several items in the office. Originally it was reported as an electrical fire but latter changed to arson. This was reinforced by discovery of several items from Anderson's office near the football field. In early December Sweetland, along with six students with ties to the athletic department, were arrested for starting the fire. The warrants for arrest were sworn to by Captain Richard Webb. As well as being a former Kentucky football coach and captain of the 1910 Wildcat football team, Webb was from a prominent Lexington family as well as being an officer of the court. Sweetland and Webb had been close friends and business partners but their friendship had deteriorated.

The case took an unexpected turn when the investigation by the State Fire Marshall, Police and District Attorney changed its focus from Sweetland to Richard Webb. Webb hired a prominent legal team which included Henry S. Breckinridge. During the preliminary trial Webb's defense attorneys tried to paint Sweetland mentally unstable and tried to switch suspicion to Sweetland. At the end of the preliminary trail the judge ruled that probable cause existed to hold Webb on the charge of arson.

At the trial Webb's defense team dropped the tactic of switching blame to Sweetland. Instead they focused on discrediting the testimony of Thomas Baker who had confessed to a charge of arson and implicated Webb as his accomplice. They also had several family members provide an alibi for Webb and were successful in having the fingerprint evidence thrown out. During final arguments the defense team argued that the prosecution had failed to Webb's motive. In the end the jury only took 45 minutes to reach a not guilty verdict.

Early in 1913, before the Webb arson case went to trial, Edwin Sweetland resigned his duties as coach and athletic administrator. The UK athletic department announced that he "could not be induced to stay." As the football coach of the Wildcats, Sweetland compiled a 23–5 mark in three seasons.

=== West Virginia ===
After the second stint at Kentucky, Sweetland moved on to West Virginia University for the 1913 season. After starting the season with two convincing wins over Davis & Elkins College and Waynesburg the Mountaineer stumbled the rest of the way to a 3–4–2 record. This did not sit well with West Virginia fans and alumni. "When WVU lost to (West Virginia) Wesleyan for the second straight season, 21–0, outraged alumni called for the hiring of a nationally known coach."

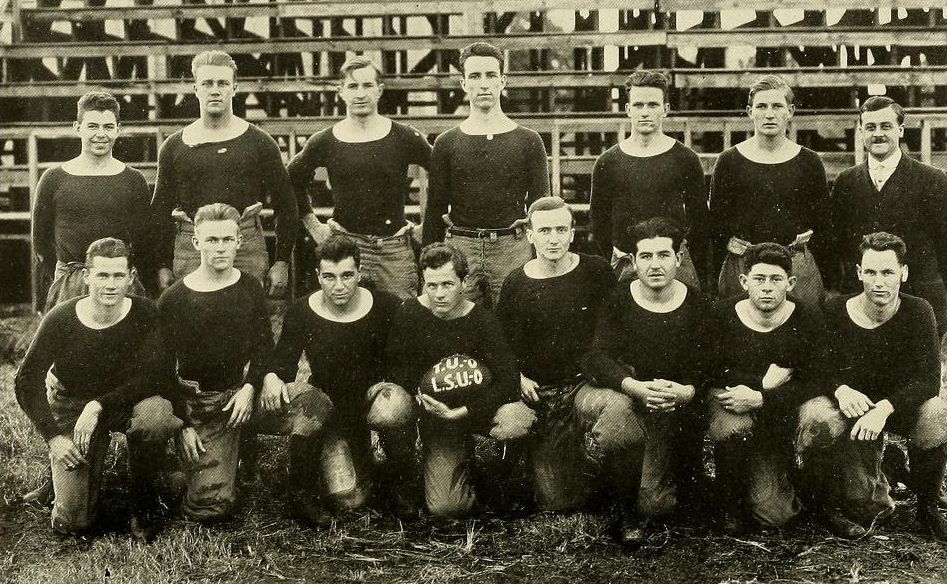
The 1914 Tulane University Football team holding a football painted to celebrate their 0–0 tie with LSU

=== Tulane ===
Sweetland left West Virginia and took a job to coach football for the 1914 season at Tulane University in New Orleans. Shortly before Sweetland was supposed to leave for New Orleans, he almost reneged of his commitment to coach Tulane. This was due to the slow recovery of a broken ankle caused by a stray foul ball while at a park in Pittsburgh, Pennsylvania. The Tulane administration successfully persuaded Sweetland that the college needed his coaching experience. In his only year as the head coach for the Green Wave, Sweetland, had a record of 3–3–1. The highlight of the season was an 82–0 victory over Centenary and a 0–0 tie with archrival LSU in the season finale. In addition to coaching football, Sweetland also coached the basketball and track teams during the 1914-15 academic year.

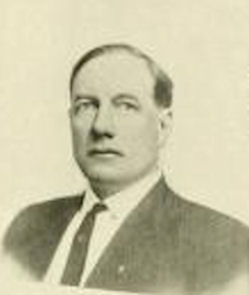
E. R. Sweetland while coach of Tulane

=== Alfred ===
After leaving Tulane, Sweetland returned to his native Western New York and spent several seasons in a part-time job as football coach at Alfred University. Under Sweetland leadership Saxons won regularly, posting a 17–5 record during his four years as coach. He took over the team in 1915 and coached it to a 4–2 record. The biggest win that season was a 13–7 victory over nearby Syracuse University's freshman team. After the season, he hired to coach the team the next season as well as being a given a "22 savage rifle" in appreciation for his success. Before the 1916 Season, Sweetland instituted pre-season practice which helped Alfred achieve one of the "most memorable football years." The team finished with a record of 5-1 including two noteworthy victories. The Saxons defeated rival Hobart College for the first time since 1907 and defeated national power Carlisle Indian Industrial School. Sweetland's 1917 squad finished the season with a 3–0 record that was shortened when two colleges cancelled games. The season included 2–0 victory over Grove City College on a field described as "liquid chocolate glue". This was the school's first unbeaten and untied season. In 1918, due to World War I, Alfred campus life was dominated by the Student Army Training Corps. The Corps was designed to provide the military with officers during the War. Alfred did not hire Sweetland to be their football coach, but instead used multiple officers from the Corps. Sweetland however did return for the 1919 season. The Saxons played seven games but only three against other four year colleges. Sweetland was critiqued for the overall play of the team and practice schedule. An open meeting was called in which criticism directed at the coach. During this meeting Sweetland declared that he could no longer coach at Alfred.

== After coaching ==
After coaching Sweetland became a farmer and lawyer in his hometown; Dryden, New York. In a draft registration card completed in September 1918, Sweetland listed his residence as Dryden and his occupation as farmer. At the time of the 1920 and 1930 United States censuses, he was living in Dryden with his wife, Hester, and his occupation was again listed as a farmer.

Sweetland also was involved in Dryden and Tompkins County politics. Sweetland was a prominent member of the local Democratic Party. He served his community by holding numerous town offices including serving as member of the local draft board. In 1937 he was named "Superintendent of Sheep and Swine" of the New York State Fair succeeding E. S. Hill of Freeville, New York. He also served as Supervisor of the Town of Dryden from 1938 to 1944 In his political career he had to overcome being a Democrat in an overwhelming Republican county. The local voter rolls when he was elected Supervisor, shows that Republicans outnumbered Democrats by close to a 2.5 to one margin in Tompkins County and a 3 to 1 margin in his hometown of Dryden.

== Family and death ==
On September 28, 1914, Sweetland married Hester Donnelly, a nurse whom he met at a Western Pennsylvania Hospital in Pittsburgh while recuperating from a broken leg he suffered at a baseball game when he was hit by a foul ball while working for the Pittsburgh Playground Association. Donnelly was born in Armagh, Ireland and emigrated with her family when she was five years old. After secretly being married in a small town in Ohio, the couple spent a short time at Sweetland home in Dryden, New York before heading to New Orleans for his job as head football coach of Tulane University. They returned to Dryden after his only season as Tulane football coach. They had one child named Edwin R. Sweetland Jr. born March 18, 1920. Mrs. Sweetland died June 6, 1936, at Memorial Hospital in Ithaca, New York.

Sweetland died on October 21, 1950. at his home in Dryden.

== Head coaching record ==
=== Football ===
Year	Team	Overall	Conference	Standing	Bowl/playoffs
Hamilton Continentals (Independent) (1899)
1899	Hamilton	8–2–1			
Syracuse Orangemen (Independent) (1900–1902)
1900	Syracuse	7–2–1			
1901	Syracuse	7–1			
1902	Syracuse	6–2–1			
Syracuse:		20–5–2			
Hamilton Continentals (Independent) (1903)
1903	Hamilton	6–3			
Hamilton:		14–5–1			
Ohio State Buckeyes (Ohio Athletic Conference) (1904–1905)
1904	Ohio State	6–5	2–1	2nd	
1905	Ohio State	8–2–2	2–0–1	2nd	
Ohio State:		14–7–2	4–1–1		
Colgate (Independent) (1908)
1908	Colgate	4–3			
Colgate:		4–3			
Kentucky State College Blue and White / Wildcats (Southern Intercollegiate Athletic Association) (1909–1910)
1909	Kentucky State College	9–1			
1910	Kentucky State College	7–2			
Miami Redskins (Ohio Athletic Conference) (1911)
1911	Miami	2–4–2	1–3–1	9th	
Miami:		2–4–2			
Kentucky State College Wildcats (Southern Intercollegiate Athletic Association) (1912)
1912	Kentucky State College	7–2	1–0		
Kentucky State College:		23–5			
West Virginia Mountaineers (Independent) (1913)
1913	West Virginia	3–4–2			
West Virginia:		3–4–2			
Tulane Olive and Blue (Southern Intercollegiate Athletic Association) (1914)
1914	Tulane	3–3–1	0-3-1		
Tulane:		3–3–1	0-3-1		
Alfred Saxons (Independent) (1915–1917)
1915	Alfred	4–2			
1916	Alfred	5–1			
1917	Alfred	3–0			
Alfred Saxons (Independent) (1919)
1919	Alfred	5–2			
Alfred:		17–5			
Total:		100–41–10			

=== Basketball ===
Record table
Season	Team	Overall	Conference	Standing	Postseason
Kentucky Wildcats (Southern Intercollegiate Athletic Association) (1909–1912)
1909–10	Kentucky	4–8			
1911–12	Kentucky	9–0			
Kentucky:		13–8			
Tulane Green Wave (Southern Intercollegiate Athletic Association) (1914–1915)
1914–15	Tulane	2–3			
Tulane:		2–3			
Total:		15–11			
National champion Postseason invitational champion Conference regular season champion Conference regular season and conference tournament champion Division regular season champion Division regular season and conference tournament champion Conference tournament champion
