= Charles E. Courtney =

American rower & coach (1849–1920)

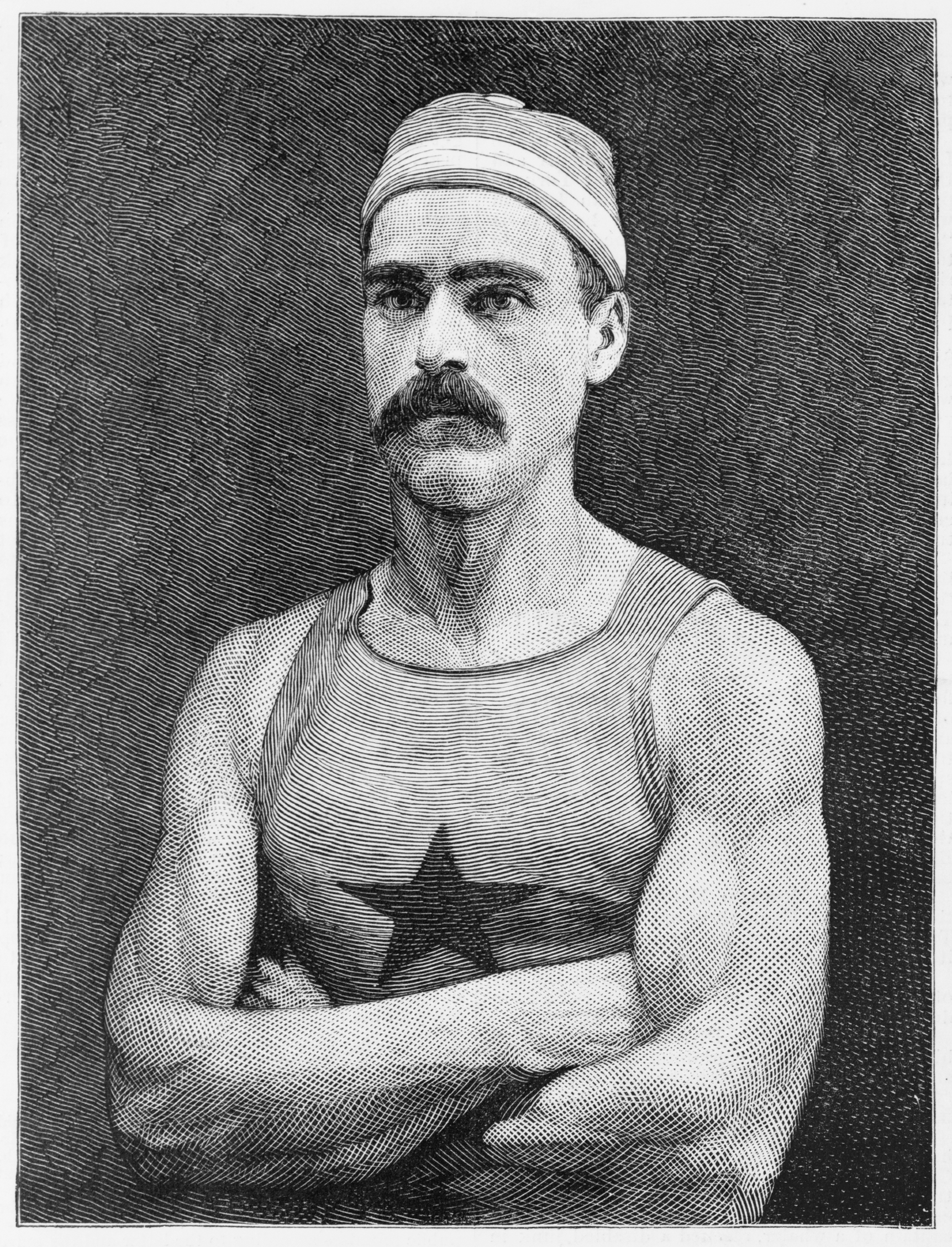
- Courtney in 1878
- Born: Charles Edward Courtney; November 13, 1849; Union Springs, New York
- Died: July 17, 1920 (aged 70) near Cayuga Lake, New York
- Occupations: Carpenter professional rower rowing coach
- Employer: Cornell University
- Height: 6 ft 0 in (183 cm)
- Spouse: Della S. Halsey

Charles Edward Courtney (November 13, 1849 – July 17, 1920) was an American rower and rowing coach from Union Springs, New York. A carpenter by trade, Courtney was a nationally known amateur rower. Courtney never lost a race as an amateur and finished a total of 88 victories.

In 1877, he moved from an amateur to a professional rower, a decision that Courtney would later regret. His professional career was marred by controversy and accusations including cowardice and race fixing. His professional career was best remembered for his controversial losses to Ned Hanlan.

As his rowing career wound down, Courtney became involved in coaching at Cornell University. He coached Cornell's rowing team from 1883 to 1920. His crews won 14 of 24 varsity eight-oar titles at the Intercollegiate Rowing Association Championship Regatta. He kept his position until he died in the summer of 1920.

== Early life ==
Courtney was born the fifth of six children on November 13, 1849, to Mr. and Mrs. James Thomas Courtney in Union Springs, New York, a small town on the north end of Cayuga Lake at the time noted for pleasure and racing yachts. Courtney's father died when he was six. From about the age of seven, he was rowing on the lake and would race other local children.

At 12, Courtney built his first boat out of hemlock boards and two-inch planks that he had found. Due to his poor workmanship he plastered yellow clay on his boat to keep it water-tight. Once on the water the clay would eventually be washed away. This did not stop him and his friends from racing the boat. They would take turns to see who row it the farthest before it sank.

After graduating from high school, Courtney went to work as a carpenter. After working for several local carpenters and architects, he went started his own carpentry business with his brother John called Courtney Brothers.

== Amateur rower ==
=== Introduction into competitive racing ===
In the late 1860s, Courtney and his childhood friend, William Cozzens, built a small boat based on John MacGregor's "Rob Roy" canoe that MacGregor used on a trip through England, Scotland and other parts of Europe. Cozzens had found a description of the canoe in a magazine article and talked Courtney into building a similar craft. Their boat (24 inches wide, 9 inches deep, and 16 feet long) was eventually outfitted with oars that Courtney and Cozzens also made themselves.

Shortly after the canoe was finished, Courtney entered a single scull race in Aurora, New York. He raced in his modified canoe that weighed 80 lb (36 kg), while several of his competitors raced in 30 lb (14 kg) racing shells. Even with the weight disadvantage, Courtney won the 3-mile (4.8 km) race by nearly half a mile.

=== From canoe to racing shell ===
Courtney continued to race at local events. As he got better at racing, he used boats with smaller and smaller widths, and eventfully raced in a regular racing shell. It was Courtney's opinion that this slow stepping-down in width allowed him to master control of each new boat. By the time he raced in Syracuse, New York on June 25, 1873, he was using a 23-feet long, 19-inch wide lap-streak boat that he bought in Geneva, New York. Courtney won the 3-mile (4.8 km) race by a quarter-mile over a field that included noted New York City rowers Charles Smith and William Bishop.

After the Syracuse race, Courtney finally bought a racing shell. The 35-feet long, 12-inch wide, 30-pound shell cost $126. At the time, Courtney was only making $1 a day as a carpenter. Courtney and his friend raised the money from the residents of Union Springs. They came up short, so a local doctor wrote a note for the last $40.

In September 1873, Courtney entered a race in Saratoga, New York with his new racing shell. He won the 3-mile (4.8 km) race against 12 other competitors by over a quarter of a mile. His time of 14 minutes and 15 seconds was a whole minute better than the then professional record held by Josh Ward.

=== Undefeated amateur champion ===
Courtney would never lose as an amateur rower and finished with a total of 88 victories in single and double scull races. Among his major victories was the National Association single sculls championship in 1875 at Saratoga where he beat four competitors in the final heat, including noted rower of the day James Riley. In 1876, he won the two amateur rowing championships at the Centennial Exposition in Philadelphia. He won the single scull championship in a time of 10 minutes and 48 1/2 seconds on a 1 1/2-mile straightaway course. A few days later, he won the double scull championship (with partner Frank E. Yates) in a time of 9 minutes and 52 1/2 seconds over the same distance.

=== Last amateur race ===
On July 14, 1877, Courtney was to race against James E. Riley at Greenwood Lake in New Jersey. Both men were considered the best amateur rowers at that time. Both had announced that after the race they would be turning professional. The 36‑year‑old Courtney came into the race undefeated and had beaten Riley twice before in the summer of 1875. These victories came in Riley's first two competitive single scull races. One of Courtney victories was only by a quarter boat length. Since that time, the 29‑year‑old Riley had rowed 13 races (winning only 8), but did have the fastest time on record. A large crowd was expected to be on hand to watch the scullers. The Montclair and Greenwood Lake Railway added extra trains to meet the demand of rowing fans that wanted to witness the event.

Before the race, Courtney drank a glass of ice tea that was laced with a drug, and was unable to race. A little after noon on the day of the race, Courtney sat down for a meal at a local inn. After the meal, he asked the waitress for ice tea. The waitress went to make the tea but was stopped by the owner of the inn, who told her he would make the tea himself. Courtney experienced a strange sensation of being too hot, and then, too cold. He went up to his room by himself. Eventually, his throat started to burn and his fingers became numb and cold. He began to ache and soon began to vomit. Riley was informed of the situation and went to visit Courtney. After the visit and consulting with the doctors treating his opponent, Riley decided that Courtney was in no condition to row that day. Riley did however row the course for time. Even without competition, he was able to do the 3-mile (4.8 km) course in a time of 20 minutes and 47.5 seconds, which was a new record.

The incident created a sensation throughout the country. The ice tea was never analyzed so the exact drug was not known. There was speculation that tartar emetic or arsenic was the poison. There were also rumors that Hoboken, New Jersey gamblers knew in advance that Courtney would be poisoned. Betting on the race changed from Courtney being a slight favorite to Riley becoming a heavy favorite on the day of the race.

== Professional rower ==
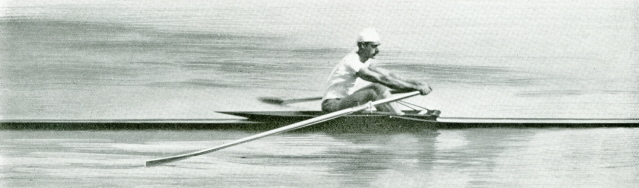
Charles Courtney in a single scull

Courtney became a professional rower after the canceled race with Riley. The decision to move into the professional ranks was one Courtney would later regret. When asked later in life why he became a professional, he responded, "Because I was a fool, I had no more business in the professional line than I had of being a preacher."

Even though he did not become a professional until 1877, this did not mean he had not profited from being an amateur rower. Courtney admitted that he was given $450 after he won the Grand National Amateur Regatta at Saratoga in 1873 by local gamblers that profited from his victory. That sum was more than a year's salary as a carpenter. In the race versus Riley where he was poisoned, Courtney and his brother had bet over $1,000 on his victory in the race. He also stated that before the race was canceled, he expected to receive half the grandstand receipts.

=== Victory over Riley ===
Courtney's first professional race was the makeup race with Riley on August 28, 1877. Courtney and Riley agreed to a single scull race over a three-mile (5 km) course with a turn (stake race) on Saratoga Lake, and a purse of $800 to the winner. Also included in the race was noted professional rower Frederick Plaisted. Fred Plaisted had been at Greenwood Lake when Courtney was poisoned and was unable to race Riley. He had planned to challenge the winner of that race. To make the race even, all three competitors had to row in identical racing sculls. Both of Courtney's rivals did have an advantage over him. Courtney had not fully recovered from the after-effects of the poisoning and planned to take it slow at the beginning of the race so he would be able to have a strong finish. Courtney was also using shorter oars than he usually used.

A large crowd of over 10,000 spectators showed up came to watch the race. Courtney had the inside (West) position with Paisted in the middle and Riley on the outside (East). When the word "go" was given, all three sculls started moved off the line at the same instant. Courtney stayed down the middle of the course while his competitors moved closer to the East shore. At the quarter mile, Plaisted was a boat length ahead of Riley and almost two lengths ahead of Courtney. By the half mile mark, Courtney had passed both of his rivals. Plaisted retook the lead 3/4 mile into the race. Riley made a move and passed Courtney, and moved even with Plaisted. Riley and Plaisted's racing sculls almost collided; this allowed Courtney to take very small lead just before the turning stake. Riley was able to take the lead back on the turn, but soon lost it to Courtney. Plaisted dropped out around the 2-mile (3.2 km) mark due to cramps. Courtney did not give up the lead and won by five boat lengths in a time of 20 minutes and 45.75 seconds. Courtney's time was off the record mark set by Riley by a quarter of a second. After the race, Riley was very disappointed, complaining about Plaisted's coming across his path at the beginning and almost hitting his boat at the turning stake.

=== Hanlan-Courtney rivalry ===
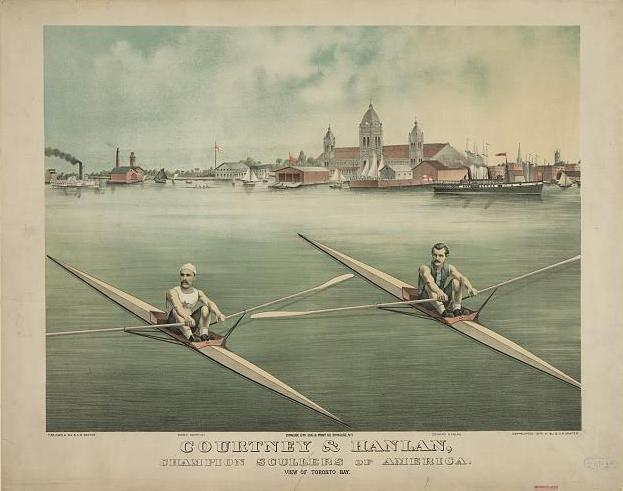
Lithograph of C. E. Courtney & Ned Hanlan in Toronto Bay

Courtney's first loss came on October 3, 1878, when he lost to Canadian champion Ned Hanlan in a very close 5-mile (8.0 km) single scull race near Lachine, Quebec with about 20,000 spectators for a $10,000 prize. Hanlan had won the professional single scull title at the Centennial Exposition in Philadelphia when Courtney had won the amateur title, and was considered one of the best professional rowers of the time. For the first four miles (6 km) the lead changed hands several times, but as they entered the last mile, Hanlan slowly but surely went to the front and was leading by three lengths at the 4 1/2-mile mark. Near the finish, both Hanlan and Courtney had to deal with a group of boats that had wandered inside the racing lane. Both rowers paused for a moment, then Hanlan shot around them and over the finish line. Before the race there were rumors that Courtney had agreed to throw the race for a guaranteed percentage of the prize. The New York Times investigated and could not find any truth to the rumors, calling him the "most unjustly accused man in the country today." Courtney reported that he lost $1,350 of his own money betting on the race. Because of the effect of the rumors on his reputation and family, Courtney stated he didn't know if he would row again.

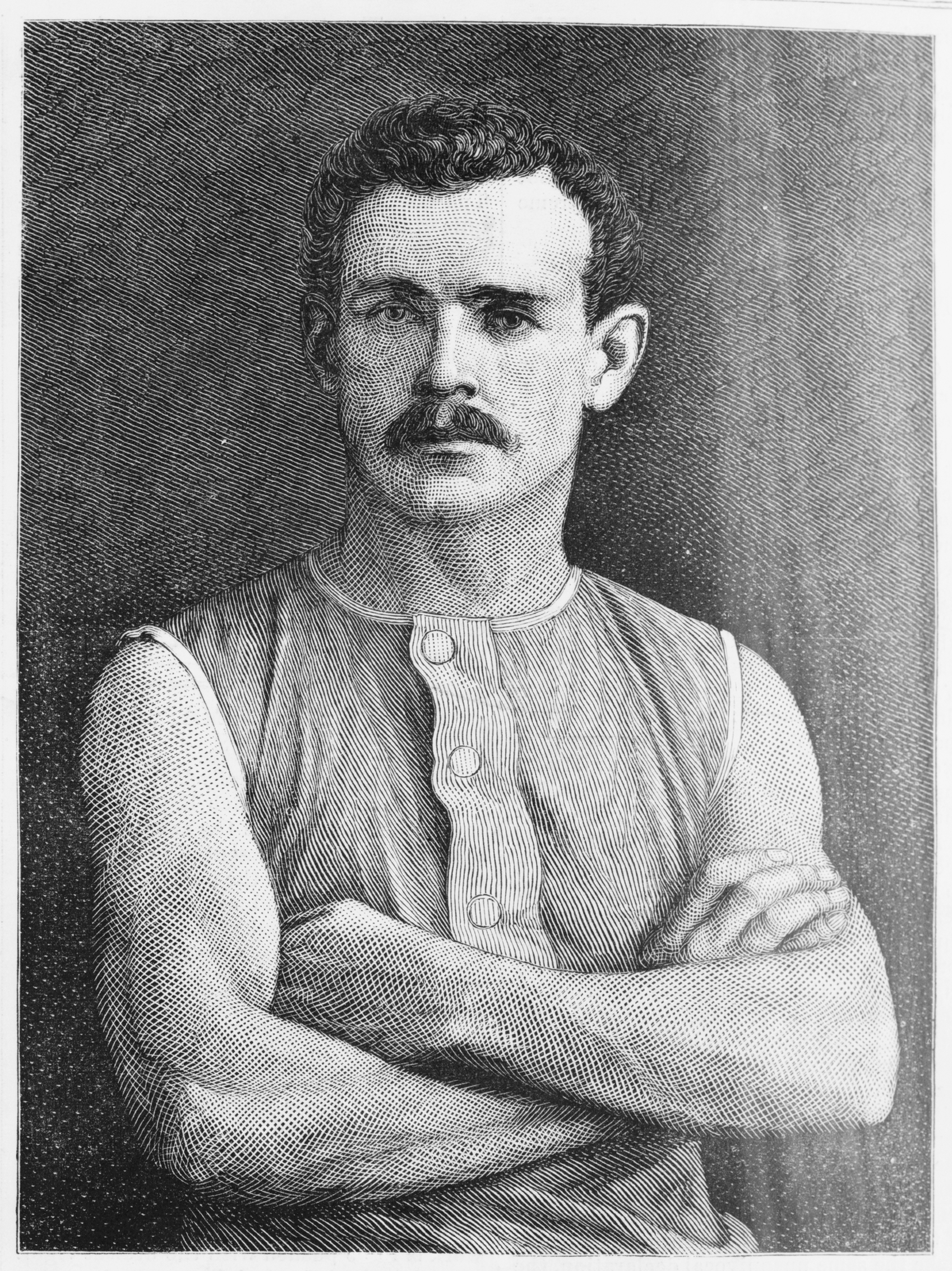
Portrait of Ned Hanlan from Harper's Weekly before the first Hanlan-Courtney race

Courtney did return to rowing, however, and the next year a rematch was scheduled at Lake Chautauqua, New York, for a $6,000 prize. To accommodate the expected crowds, a temporary grandstand was built along with a special rail line to carry spectators to the site. The morning before the race, Courtney's racing shell was sawed in half, and he declined offers of other boats. What actually happened to the boat is unknown. Some thought that Hanlan's supporters had destroyed the boat, but others suspected Courtney had done it himself to avoid another loss. Courtney claimed Hanlan was out on the town the night before the race and his supporters were concerned they would lose their money they wagered on him. He would also claim that Hanlan's supporters offered Courtney the entire $6,000 prize to fix the race. Courtney was later reported as saying in response to the offer, "Gentlemen, the race will be raced tomorrow, and whoever wins it will have to row for it." Courtney's backers believed that Hanlan's backers sneaked into Courtney's boathouse and destroyed his boat. Another version of events was that Courtney did not want to row unless the race would be fixed in his favor. Hanlan's friends agreed that Hanlan would lose. Hanlan and his friends did not have any intention of living up to this promise to Courtney and bet heavily on Hanlan to win. Courtney's supporters learned of the double-cross and destroyed Courtney's boat.

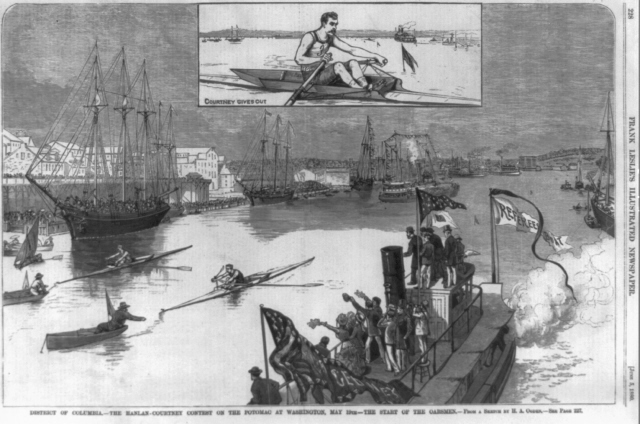
The start of the Hanlan-Courtney rowing contest on the Potomac River

In 1880, the two finally met again. The race took place on the Potomac River in Washington, DC. Up to 100,000 people were estimated to have attended the race including President Rutherford B. Hayes. The race was considered so important that the United States Congress adjourned so members could watch. Robert Emmet Odlum, who would later be killed jumping off Brooklyn Bridge, swam the entire course before the race, and was surprised to learn from Hanlan and Courtney that neither could swim. Hanlan took an early lead, causing Courtney to quit. Courtney turned his boat around to return to the start/finish line before Hanlan reached the turning post. Many spectators thought Courtney was winning, but Hanlan passed him before the finish line.

=== Later years ===
Courtney continued rowing after the losses to Hanlan. Courtney and Hanlan almost met again when Toronto, Ontario, Canada held an international regatta on September 12, 1881. Both Hanlan and Courtney entered along with other famous scullers of the day, including Wallace Ross and James A. Ten Eyck. Hanlan withdrew before the race because he was out of condition, so a rematch did not take place. Courtney finished third in the single scull race, with Ross winning and being crowned unofficial world champion. On September 1, 1882, he beat George W. Lee in a three-mile (5 km) race on Canadarago Lake, finishing the course in a record time of 19 minutes and 31 1/2 seconds. In 1885, Courtney and his partner P. H. Conley defeated the team of George H. Hosmer and Jacob Gaudaur for the double scull championship of the world. Shortly after the race, Courtney's old rival, Ned Hanlan, and his partner George W. Lee challenged them to a race. Later that year in Albany, New York, Courtney and Conley lost to Hanlan and Lee by less than 10 seconds. After 18 years of competitive rowing, both as an amateur and a professional, Courtney finished his rowing career with only 7 losses in 137 races and regattas.

== Coaching career ==
In 1883, Charles Courtney took over as coach of the Cornell University rowing team. Courtney's crews never finished below third and won 14 of 24 varsity eight-oar titles at the Intercollegiate Rowing Association Championship Regatta. In seven of the regattas, his team won all the events, including the varsity eight, varsity four, and freshman eight. During Courtney's tenure as coach, no other school would sweep every event in the regatta. Before becoming coach, Courtney did have a history with Cornell University. In 1872, he participated in the first Cornell rowing regatta as a member of the Union Springs Boat Club. Courtney's four-oared crew from Union Springs beat Cornell, but helped build excitement at the college for rowing. Courtney also won a two-mile (3 km) single scull race on the same day.

=== Early years ===
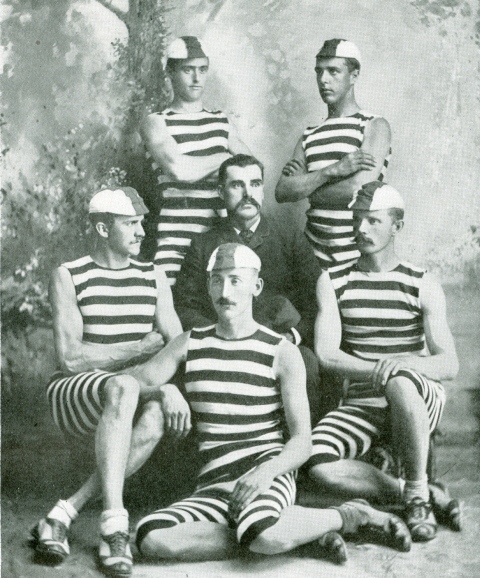
The 1883 Cornell's Varsity Rowing Team. Courtney, as coach, is surrounded by his crew

In 1883, Courtney was hired for 10 days to help train the Cornell University four-oared varsity crew for their 1 1/2 mile race against Wesleyan College, University of Pennsylvania, and Princeton University at the Lake George Regatta. Princeton and Penn were favored since they both had beaten several of the top rowing clubs in America. He was hired again by Cornell in 1884, which drew criticism because of his past controversies during his professional career. The New York Times, which editorialized, "If college boys cannot learn to row without associating with persons like Courtney..., perhaps they would be quite as well off if they devoted a little more time to classics and mathematics and a little less to rowing." Because of the help he gave during the 1883 season that allowed Cornell to defeat rivals at Lake George, Cornell overlooked his ethics and hired him on for his extensive rowing knowledge. Courtney coached the four-oared crews at Cornell over the next few years and consistently won. Notable victories included winning the Childs Cup over Pennsylvania in 1885 and 1887, and winning the Downing Cup in The People's Regatta at Philadelphia, Pennsylvania in 1888.

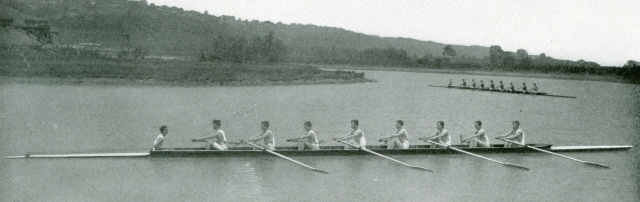
The 1891 Cornell team

To gain some respect, in the fall of 1888, it was decided that the 1889 Cornell crew would switch from a four-oared varsity crew to an eight-oared varsity crew. Courtney was hindered by a lack of equipment. He had to coach from the bank of the lake since Cornell did not have a launch. The practice shell was weak and in poor condition, and the team did not receive their eight-man shells until they arrived in New London for the first race. Courtney's Cornell crew easily beat Pennsylvania and Columbia University at New London, and then a few weeks later broke the world record for an eight-oared 1 1/2-mile race versus Pennsylvania at the Schuylkill in Philadelphia. These victories created great enthusiasm for the rowing program at Cornell.

The Courtney-coached crews over the next few years were very similar to the 1889 team. All the crews were comparatively light weight that rowed with a rapid stroke. This style usually led to victories. One notable win was over Columbia and Penn in 1891. In this race at New London, Courtney's crew broke the world record for an eight-oared 3-mile (4.8 km) race with a time of 14 minutes 27 1/2 seconds.

=== 1895 Henley Royal Regatta ===
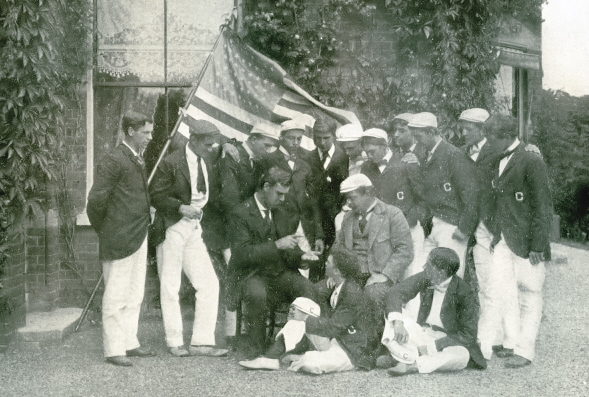
Cornell's 1895 Henley Royal Regatta varsity crew. Courtney sitting on chair (left).

In 1895, Courtney and his Cornell varsity crew competed in the Grand Challenge Cup at the Henley Royal Regatta in England. At the time, the Grand Challenge Cup was regarded as the most important race in the rowing world. Around 100,000 people would watch the event annually. The Regatta was rowed against a slow current river, was wide enough for two boats, and was done in heats. In 1891, the Leader Club, one of the most powerful clubs in England, set the one-mile (1.6 km) and 550 yards (500 m) course record of 6 minutes and 51 seconds. Before traveling to England, Cornell's crew did the Cup distance in 6 minutes 56 seconds in still water.

Courtney and the team left New York City on May 29, 1895, on the Steamship Paris for the race. The early departure would allow his team to practice in England for five weeks. Courtney, however, was not able to watch any of the races due to an illness.

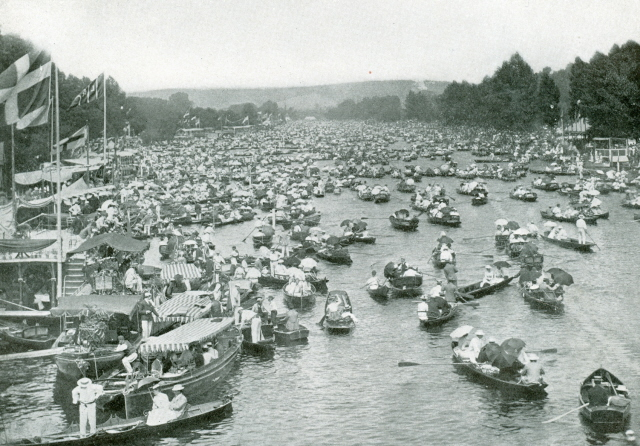
Between heats at the 1895 Henley Royal Regatta

Cornell's first heat was versus the Leander Club crew of London, England, coached by Rudolph C. Lehmann. The members of the Leander Club were composed almost entirely of former Oxford and Cambridge oarsman. They had won the Cup seven times and were the four-time defending champion. Leander was considered the best crew in England, and was the favorite to win the Cup in 1895. The race was a contrast of rowing styles. Cornell rowed the Courtney stroke, which was short and choppy compared to the Leander's long and sweeping stroke. The heat was marred by controversy right from the start. Cornell and Leander crew took up their positions at the starting point. When the umpire asked if the crews were ready, F. D. Colson, the Cornell coxswain, answered "yes". The Leander crew insisted two members shouted "No" and C. W. Kent, the crew's stroke, held up his hand. The umpire insisted that someone from the English crew answered that they were ready and then gave the command to start the race. Both crews shot out from the starting line. Cornell rowed with strong even strokes, but only half of the Leander club was rowing. At that point, Leander stopped rowing, and C. F. Beggs and C. W. Kent, the Leander coxswain and stroke respectively, protested to the umpire. When the umpire did not tell Cornell to stop or return to the start, Cornell continued rowing at a leisurely pace, followed by the referee's boat. Cornell finished the course of one mile (1.6 km) and 550 yards (500 m) in 8 minutes and 11 seconds. This was more than a minute over the time they were rowing in practice. When they crossed the finish line, they were declared the winner of the heat by the umpire. The Leander crew protested the Cornell victory, stating that they notified the umpire before he gave the notice to start the race. They appealed it to the Stewards of the Regatta, who met at the end of the day but they ruled in favor of Cornell victory. They adopted the following resolution: "Resolved, That the committee, while deeply regretting the most unfortunate misunderstand, feel that they must abide by the laws of boat racing and cannot review the decision of the umpire or starter."

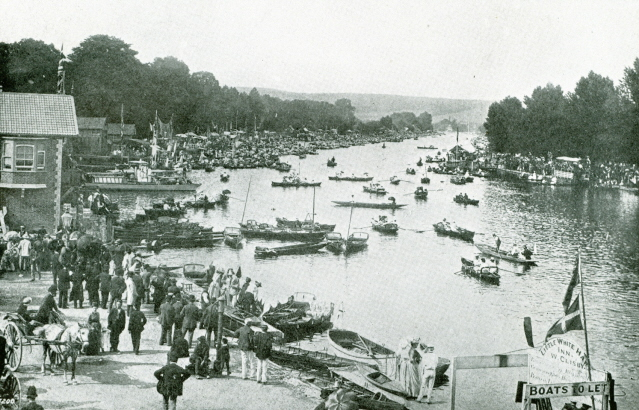
View of the finish of the 1895 Henley Royal Regatta

Cornell moved to the semi-finals of the Grand challenge cup by defeating Leander. In its second race against Trinity Hall from Cambridge, things did not go well for Courtney's crew. Cornell came off the line fast, pulling 24 strokes in a half-minute. Cornell took the lead by a few feet. At the quarter-mile, they had a third of a boat length lead and increased it to a half a length at the half-mile mark. Trinity surged and by the time the boats reached the mile mark, they had passed Cornell. Shortly after Trinity took the lead, a sudden collapse occurred in the Cornell boat. The blades of the oars went flying, Hager (No. 3) and Fennell (No. 5) missed the water with their oars and almost fell out of the boat. Trinity continued the last 300 yards (270 m) to victory by seven lengths. Fennell had caught a crab and the handle of his oar struck his side, inflicting injury including bruising his groin. Despite the pain, he continued to row even though he showed signs of exhaustion. After the race, Fennell was placed in doctors' care. Trinity Hall would go on and win the Cup that year.

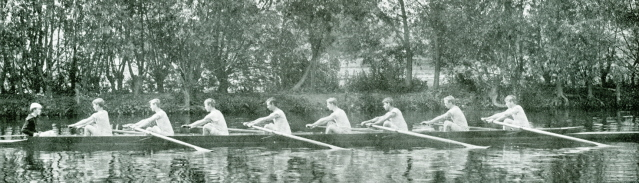
1895 Cornell varsity crew (Henley) on the Thames River

With two controversial races, the trip to England generated both bad feelings and bad press for Courtney and the Cornell rowing team. The controversial first heat with Leander caused ill will in England with many considering Cornell to have acted in an unsportsmanlike manner. Courtney believed he received good treatment from the fans at Henley, and was mistreated by the English press. Courtney also had to contend with bad press back home. Courtney believed that part of the problem was the rivalry between competing wire services. C. S. Francis, a Cornell alumnus who helped raise money for the trip to England, was also the editor of the Troy Times, which was associated with United Press. Francis stayed with the Cornell team and helped out United Press reporters with information about the team. The Chicago Associated Press wanted to have their own representative. When this was denied, Courtney claimed that they tried to get even. Courtney insisted that several things that Chicago Associated Press reported, such as troubles and disagreements between members of the team and Mr. Francis' saying the drawing of the Leander rowing club was fixed, were fabrications. After the regatta, the members of the Cornell rowing team released a statement to the press to address the matter of the Leander race. It stated that it was their understanding that under the rules if they stopped they would have been disqualified. They also said they would consider another race with Leander if they would have won.

While Courtney was in England, Fred R. White of Cleveland, Ohio, a senior in Law School at Cornell and manager of both the football team and the freshman rowing team, took a team to the Intercollegiate Rowing Association Championship Regatta in Poughkeepsie. Cornell was also defeated at this race. Columbia won the race that was marred by rough water. The Pennsylvania boat was swamped while the Cornell boat was filled with water as it crossed the finish line.

=== Harvard and Yale: The fight for respect ===
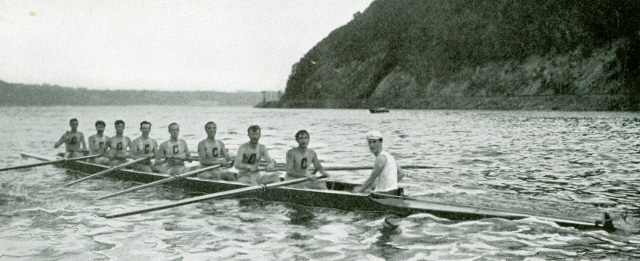
1896 Cornell varsity crew immediately after winning the IRA regatta over Harvard, Penn, and Columbia

Even with the success that Courtney and his Cornell varsity rowing team was having, both Harvard University and Yale University refused to race. It was believed that the snub was because Cornell was a relatively young school and was not considered up to the class or academic standards. Others speculated that Courtney's crews were too fast and losing to them would be unbearable. The snub had its history dating back to the collapse of the Rowing Association of American Colleges. After repeated losses to what they thought were lesser schools, including losing to Cornell at the 1875 National Rowing Association of American Colleges Regatta, Yale and Harvard virtually stopped rowing against any one other than each other. Yale pulled out of the association before the 1876 regatta while Harvard waited until the following year. The loss of these two schools caused the association to collapse. Both schools decided to concentrate on meets between each other based on the Cambridge and Oxford model in England.

In the late 1890s, Courtney's Varsity team was finally able to compete against both Yale and Harvard due to events unrelated to rowing. After a very violent football game in the fall of 1894, the faculty of Harvard suspended all athletic relationships with Yale, effective at the end of the 1894–95 school year. This included their annual regatta, which dated to 1852. In the summer of 1896, the first year that Harvard and Yale did not meet due to the ban, Yale sent its Varsity to the Henley Royal Regatta in England.

That year, Harvard sent its varsity team to Poughkeepsie to race Cornell, Pennsylvania, and Columbia in the annual Intercollegiate Rowing Association Regatta. Courtney's team beat all three schools with a time of 19 minutes and 22.9 seconds for the four-mile (6 km) course. The next year, Harvard and Yale ended their dispute when Walter Camp representing Yale agreed to Harvard's demands for the next five years. One of Harvard's demands was that they meet in all athletics that each school sponsored. Yale had wanted to be selective on which teams played each other. As part of an agreement between the two schools, their rowing teams were to meet in Poughkeepsie, New York during the 1897 season. Since Harvard had already agreed to meet Cornell they were also included. Even given their past success, Courtney and his crew were given little chance to win a race against Harvard and Yale. The coaches of both of his opponents were on record that they both would beat Cornell. Gamblers and bookmakers made Cornell a heavy underdog. Newspaper writers before the meet said that Cornell was not in the same class as Harvard and Yale. They also criticized Cornell's stroke as weak and in bad form. Even with the odds stacked against Cornell, Courtney believed his team could win, especially after seeing his competition row in practice. Courtney believed that losing would mean the end of Cornell's fight for recognition.

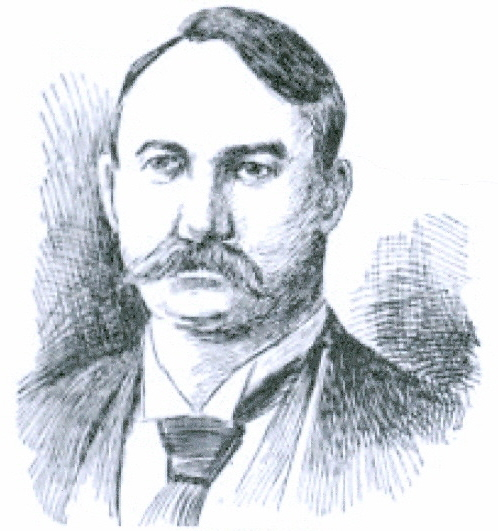
Bob Cook, Yale's 1897 rowing coach

The 1897 Cornell crew that raced Harvard and Yale was very different from the other two school's rowing teams. First, Courtney's crew was both lighter and shorter than their competition. The Cornell team came in 100 pounds less than Yale and 72 pounds less than Harvard. The other major difference was that Harvard and Yale used a stroke that was influenced by English rowing while Courtney taught his crew his very American stroke. Harvard, coached by Rudolph C. Lehmann, used a typical English stroke that was long and sweeping with the rowers stretching as far as possible on the catch to drive the water hard. Yale, coached by Bob Cook, used a modification of the English stroke, using a much longer slide. Cornell's stroke featured a long stride with little back motion.

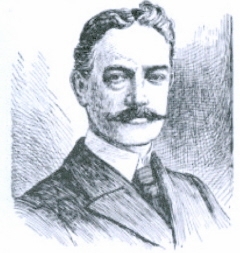
Rudolph C. Lehmann, Harvard's 1897 rowing coach

A large crowd showed up, representing all three schools that included several members of high society, including J. Pierpont Morgan and August Belmont, Jr. An estimated 15,000 fans watched the race, including 4,000 people who bought tickets on the open-air 50-car observation train. The observation train sold out at $15 a seat, which was considered a very high price for the day. Scalpers were selling tickets for seats on the train at even higher prices.

In the race, Harvard took the early lead out of the gate with Yale second. Both of the leaders’ strokes were long and slow while Cornell stuck to its stroke. At the half-mile mark, Yale edged in front of Harvard but could not hold the lead form a surging Cornell who took a half boat lead by the end of the first mile. The Courtney-coached crew continued to build on their lead while Harvard sputtered and fell well behind Yale. Throughout the race, Cornell's coxswain, Freddie Colson, motivated his teammates by reminding them of what their critic had said about them before the race. About a half-mile from the finish, Yale tried to make a move but it was too late—Cornell won by 3 lengths.

The victory was not only seen as Cornell dominance in American college rowing, but the superiority of America and the American stroke over the English stroke. Newspapers across the nation proclaimed the superiority of the Courtney's American stroke. The Philadelphia Inquirer wrote that "there is another thing in Cornell's victory to rejoice over, and that is that hers was the distinctly American stroke. We feel sorry for Mr. Lehmann but must admit we did not look for his stroke to triumph." The Minneapolis Tribune wrote that "the splendid victory...was not more a tribute to the superior muscle and methods of the Ithacans than it was a rebuke to the all too prevalent practice of going abroad for our manners."

Even with a victory, both schools continued to see Cornell as inferior. A Yale professor was quoted as saying, "In the future, let us play with people in our class." The following year, Cornell would beat both schools again, this time in New London, Connecticut. After that defeat to Cornell, Yale and Harvard decided to return to meets against only each other.

=== Decline and revival of championship form ===
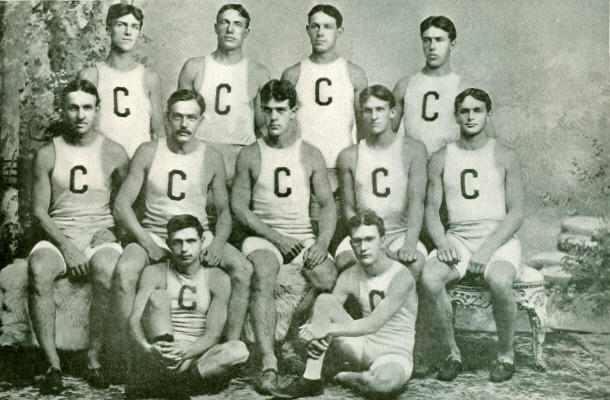
1898 Cornell Varsity eight-oar rowing team

After beating Yale and Harvard in 1897 at Poughkeepsie, New York, Cornell rowed and beat its traditional Intercollegiate Rowing Association rivals, Penn and Columbia, little over a week later on the same course. Cornell tried to have both Columbia and Penn as part of the regatta of 1897 but Yale declined. Once again, Cornell won the regatta, this time by 10 boat-lengths over Columbia. Penn did not finish the race because their boat was swamped 2 1/2 miles into the 4-mile (6.4 km) race. These two victories left little doubt who was the best American college crew. It also quieted Courtney's critics that said his crew was outclassed by Harvard and Yale, and questioned his conditioning methods.

The next year, Courtney attempted to have his crew repeat its victories over Harvard and Yale and then win Intercollegiate Rowing Association regatta a few days later. The major difference was that the two regattas were in two different locations in 1898. The first race was in New London, Connecticut and the second was on Saratoga Lake. After beating Harvard and Yale, Cornell lost to Pennsylvania. They were able to beat Columbia as well as University of Wisconsin–Madison, who was completing in first IRA Championship Regatta. Courtney's crew was unable to overcome fatigue of a hard race in New London as well as the travel and the intense summer heat. This race proved to be a turning point in American college rowing, breaking Cornell's domination of the sport. Penn, coached by Ellis Ward, would go to win the 1899 and 1900 Intercollegiate Rowing Association championships. In both 1899 and 1900, Cornell finished third, losing even to the University of Wisconsin–Madison.

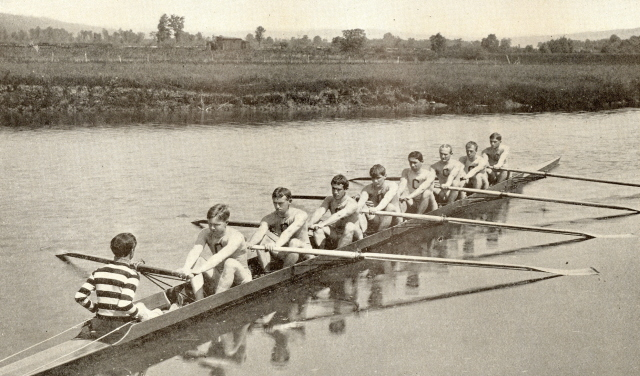
1901 Cornell Varsity eight-oar rowing team

In 1901, Cornell returned to championship form when it won the Varsity eight-oared race at the Intercollegiate Rowing Association Regatta. By this time, Cornell had to compete with more college crews. With the addition of Georgetown University in 1900 and Syracuse University in 1901, the eight-oared varsity race had grown to 6 colleges. Courtney's crew won the four-mile (6 km) event in world record time of 18 minutes 53 1/5 seconds. From 1901 to 1916, Courtney's Cornell team won 11 of 16 Intercollegiate Rowing Association varsity eight-oared championships, with Columbia winning in 1914 and Syracuse winning in 1904, 1908, 1913, and 1916. During that same time, his freshman eight-oared crew won 10 IRA championships.

=== Battle for control ===
For the 1904 rowing season, Coach Courtney offered Edwin Sweetland, former Syracuse rowing coach, the assistant coach position at Cornell. Sweetland had just left Hamilton College where he was employed as the football coach. Courtney wanted Sweetland to replace F. D. Colson, who had moved on to become coach at Harvard. While negotiations were still pending, the Rowing Committee of the Cornell Athletic Council announced that they hired C. A. Lueder for the position. This caused a power struggle between Courtney and the Athletic Council for control of the rowing program. The conflict was resolved when the Rowing Committee canceled the job offer to Lueder. In addition, the Athletic Council limited their interference with the rowing team by giving Coach Courtney the power to pick members of the crew and designate the oarsmen positions. Sweetland, however, did not become Courtney's assistant because in the time it took resolve the conflict, he was offered and accepted the position as head football coach at Ohio State University. With Sweetland out of the picture, Courtney hired Lauder as his assistant rowing coach

=== Train accident and retirement speculation ===
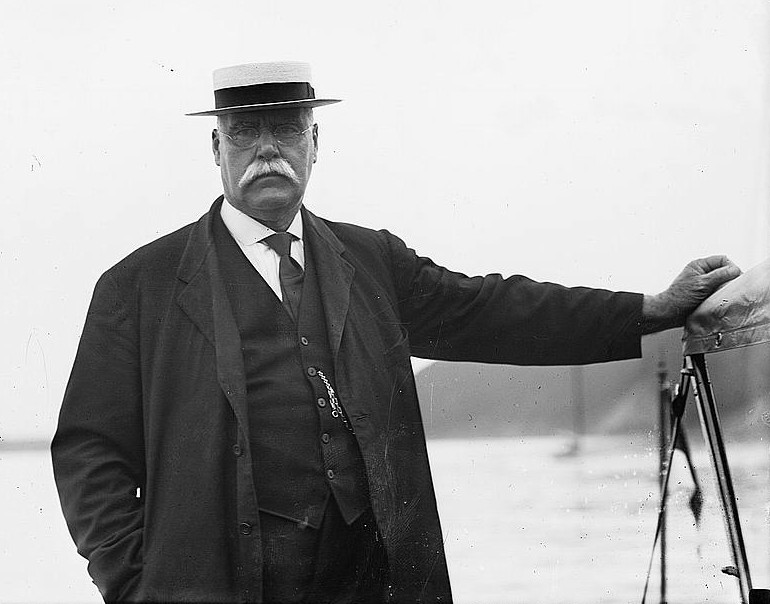
Courtney between 1910 and 1915.

Courtney suffered a skull fracture on June 12, 1915, while traveling by train with his team to the 1915 Intercollegiate Rowing Association Championship Regatta. The train lurched and his head struck one of the berths. At first he did not think anything about the incident, but he started hemorrhage from his nose and mouth. He refused to consult a doctor and continued to get his team ready for the regatta. On race day, he was confined to bed and returned to Ithaca, New York where the skull fracture was diagnosed. Courtney would sue New York Central for $75,000 for his injuries.

The accident increased speculation that Courtney would retire from coaching, or at least move to a more advisory capacity. At the time of the accident, he had one more year left on his contract. Jim Rice, coach of the Columbia crew, was considered the leading candidate to replace Courtney. After several months under a physician's care, Courtney returned to coach Cornell. Under the close supervision of a nurse, he guided his team to the Intercollegiate Rowing Association Championship Regatta in 1916. Before the race, it was announced that he would retire at the end of the season. Even with the announcement, there was still speculation that he would remain with the team in some advisory capacity, but with some authority.

Due to World War I, college rowing competitions were suspended in 1917. Cornell resumed rowing in a limited fashion in 1918, but the Intercollegiate Rowing Association Championship Regatta did not return until 1920. Courtney and his Cornell team returned for this regatta with his freshman and junior varsity teams winning national championships while his varsity came in second, losing to a Syracuse University team coached by James A. Ten Eyck by a boat length.

== Death ==
On July 17, 1920, Courtney died of apoplexy at his summer cottage on Farley's Point on Cayuga Lake, New York near his boyhood home. After taking a morning row on the Lake, he returned to the cottage. Around 11:00 am, he was found losing consciousness by his wife. She went for help, returning with Hart Carr, but he was already dead. This was confirmed by Dr. E. G. Fish of Union Springs, New York. After nearly three decades as coach, John Hoyle replaced Courtney as coach of Cornell crew.

== Coaching philosophy ==
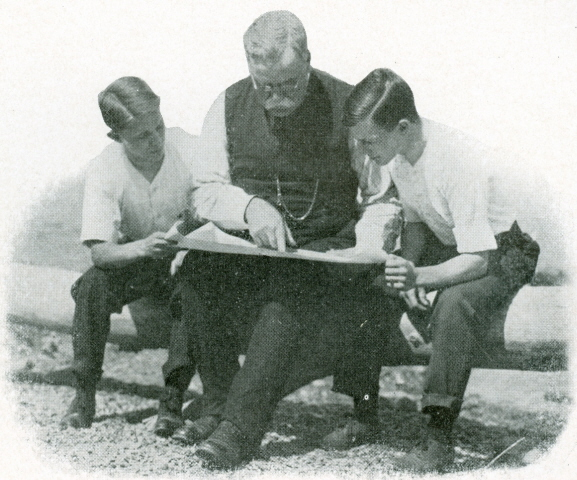
Charles Courtney talking with his coxswains at the 1906 IRA Regatta

=== Courtney Stroke ===
Both as a rower and as a rowing coach, Courtney was known for his distinctive stroke. This style of rowing would become known as the Courtney Stroke. The most evident trait of the stroke is the positioning of the back. The back is always kept in a very straight position. Courtney is quoted as saying, "No kink in the back if I have anything to say about it." He kept the back straight to allow the lungs to work without difficulty with no strain on the abdominal muscles. His idea was influenced by watching famous professional rower Harry Coulter in 1870 at Buffalo, New York.

The basic philosophy of Courtney stroke is to keep the oars (sculls or sweep) in the water as long as possible and in the air as short as possible. To do this, Courtney taught his rowers to sharply lower the hands to the lap when the preceding stroke is finished. This forced the blade of the oar out of the water perpendicular to the surface. Then he required his rowers to quickly shoot their arms forward moving the blade back to start another stroke. He emphasized that the blade should be as close as possible to the water. He wanted the blade to enter the water at slight inclined to the surface of the water to allow it to enter cleanly. Once the blade entered the water, he taught his rowers to immediately start the stroke. During the stroke he wanted the blade to always be covered but not sunk too deep.

=== Rower selection ===
When Courtney was deciding which men to put on his Cornell crew, he would pick men of high moral character and strong in their studies, not just for their athletic ability. He would also try to ascertain their disposition and temperament. Courtney preferred men that were methodical and systematic. It was his view that if one of the rowers was a disturbing element he would have trouble producing a fast crew. Courtney also maintained absolute control of the crew, and would remove and substitute anyone if he believed it would help the crew succeed.

=== Views on alcohol and tobacco ===
Personally, Courtney never drank an alcoholic beverage or used any form of tobacco. He also had strong views against alcohol and tobacco use by his rowers because he believed it would affect their ability to work. Courtney summed up his view: "I have found in my experience that young men are much better off, and do better work, without alcoholic stimulants than with them, and they are, therefore, absolutely prohibited in our training. As to tobacco, I believe young men do better work when not using tobacco than when using it, and it is prohibited in our training here at Cornell University.” This went against old traditional rowing practice of drinking beer instead water during training. It was believed that alcohol would strengthen the body while water would weaken the body.

== Legacy ==
The impact of Charles Courtney career's as a competitive rower was very profound. During his professional career, rowing was at the height of its popularity in the United States, and was considered one of the major sports in America. Some believe that the controversies surrounding the Hanlan and Courtney single scull races in 1878 and 1880 caused a public backlash against professional rowing that eventually led to its loss of popularity. The American public lost confidence in the integrity of the sport, assuming that the races were fixed. By the late 1890s, professional rowing had all but disappeared in the United States with only a few exceptions.

The impact of Charles Courtney's career as a rowing coach was also very far-reaching. When Charles Courtney started his college coaching career at Cornell, few colleges in America were active in rowing other than Cornell; Harvard, Yale, Columbia, and Pennsylvania were the only other schools to have significant programs. Several of his former rowers would help expand the number of rowing schools by starting or developing rowing programs across the country. In 1900, Edwin Sweetland, who rowed varsity for Courtney in 1899, became the first rowing coach at Syracuse University. Mark Odell, who rowed Varsity for Cornell in 1897, was instrumental in establishing the rowing program at the University of Washington. In addition, The University of Wisconsin–Madison rowing program was started with the help of the University President Charles Kendall Adams, former President of Cornell during the beginning of Courtney's tenure. From his experiences with Courtney at Cornell, Adams knew how a strong athletic program could increase his University's national reputation. In the spring of 1894, Adams hired Amos W. Marston, who rowed for Courtney from 1889 to 1892, as the first Wisconsin Badgers rowing coach.

Courtney was also instrumental in American college sports in the transition of power away from the students to the head coach. He helped transform the head coach into the dictatorial coach seen throughout the 20th century. When he was first hired, it was common practice for the captain of any team to hire the coach and the captain decided on whether the coach stayed on. Since the captain was a student, they would change from one year to the next, and there was no job security. Unlike other 1890s college coaches, Courtney signed a multi-year contract, starting in 1895. He used his job security to demonstrate his power when he overruled team selection of the team captain for the Henley Regatta that same year. Another illustration of his authoritative power that he had gained was in 1897 when he kicked out most of team for eating strawberry shortcake before the Intercollegiate Rowing Association Regatta. He would instead take a crew made up of mostly substitutes to victory.

== Bibliography ==
- "Courtney – Master Oarsman – Champion Coach", Margaret K Look, 1989
- "Courtney and Cornell Rowing", CVP Young, 1923
