= Walsh Cup =

Walsh Cup may refer to:

- The Walsh Cup (hurling), a competition in Ireland
- The Walsh Cup (rowing), a contest in the United States
