= American Sculling Championship =

The American Sculling Championship for professionals are rowing races conducted under the challenge system. For details of this see World Sculling Championship, Challenges.

All races were with a turn.

The following table shows winners from 1859 to 1888. Other races must have taken place at a later date and others may be add to this table.

Date (DMY)	Winner	Loser	Length	Comment
11-10-1859	Joshua Ward	T Daw	5 miles	See Ward Brothers (rowers)
13-08-1862	James Hamill	Joshua Ward	3 miles	-
14-08-1862	James Hamill	Joshua Ward	5 miles	-
23-07-1863	Joshua Ward	James Hamill	5 miles	-
28-09-1863	James Hamill	Joshua Ward	5 miles	-
19-07-1864	James Hamill	Joshua Ward	5 miles	-
21-05-1867	W Brown	James Hamill	5 miles	-
09-09-1867	James Hamill	W Brown	5 miles	Sunk
19-06-1868	James Hamill	H Coulter	5 miles	-
09-09-1868	W Brown #	H Coulter	-	less than 5 miles
08-07-1874	George Brown	William Scharff	5 miles	-
26-09-1874	George Brown	E Morris	5 miles	-
11-09-1875	E Morris	H Coulter	-	less than 5 miles
16-10-1875	E Morris	H Coulter	-	less than 5 miles
21-10-1876	William Scharff	E Morris	5 miles	-
09-06-1877	E Morris	William Scharff	5 miles	-
13-10-1877	E Morris	P Luther	5 miles	-
20-06-1878	Ned Hanlan	E Morris	5 miles	-
03-10-1878	Ned Hanlan	Charles E. Courtney	5 miles	-
- 1879	Ned Hanlan	Charles E. Courtney	5 miles	'The Fixed Match'
19-05-1880	Ned Hanlan	Charles E. Courtney	-	-
26-05-1880	Ned Hanlan	James Riely	5 miles	-
24-10-1885	James Teemer	Ned Hanlan	3 miles	-
12-06-1886	Jacob Gaudaur	James Teemer	3 miles	-
30-05-1887	Jacob Gaudeur	Ned Hanlan	-	less than 3 miles
23-07-1887	Ned Hanlan	Jacob Gaudaur	3 miles	-
13-08-1887	James Teemer	Ned Hanlan	-	less than 3 miles
28-10-1887	James Teemer	Jacob Gaudeur	3 miles	-
24-11-1888	William Joseph O'Connor	James Teemer	3 miles	-
02-08-1919	John B. Kelly Sr.	Paul Costello		

1. Walter Brown died in March 1871 while still Champion

A much later race occurred when Tom Sullivan (rower) attempted to win the Championship of America in August 1905 when he raced Edward Durnan of Canada in a 3-mile (4.8 km) race in Toronto. Sullivan was soundly beaten and Durnan went on to unsuccessfully challenge for the World Sculling Title. Durnan was Hanlan's nephew.
