= Amos W. Marston =

American rowing coach (1865–1947)

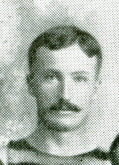
- Marston from 1889
- Born: October 9, 1865; Winnebago County, Illinois, U.S.
- Died: May 8, 1947 (aged 81); Chicago, Illinois, U.S.
- Education: B.L. 1892, LL.B. 1893
- Alma mater: Cornell University
- Occupations: Amateur rower, rowing coach, lawyer
- Employer: University of Wisconsin

Amos Wilbur Marston (October 9, 1865 – May 8, 1947) was an American lawyer, amateur rower, and rowing coach. He was a graduate of Cornell University with a B.L. in 1892 and an LL.B. in 1893. After leaving Cornell he moved to Chicago, where he practiced law.

== Amateur rower ==
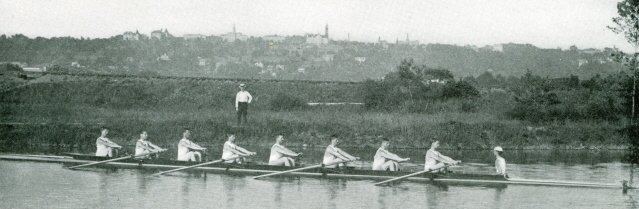
1892 Cornell University Varsity rowing team. Marston is 5th from the left

While attending Cornell University, he was part of the varsity rowing team from 1889 to 1892. He was coached at Cornell by Hall of Fame coach Charles E. Courtney. Marston was part of the 1889 Cornell crew that easily beat University of Pennsylvania and Columbia University at New London, Connecticut and then a few weeks later broke the world record for and eight oared three mile race versus Pennsylvania at the Schuylkill in Philadelphia. He would also be part of the 1891 team that set a world record over three mile course with a time of 14 minutes and 27 ½ seconds at an eight oared intercollegiate race in New London, Connecticut. In 1892, his last season rowing at Cornell, he was named Captain of the team.

== Rowing coach ==
Marston was hired in the spring of 1894 as the University of Wisconsin's first rowing coach by then university president Charles Kendall Adams. Marston prepared the Wisconsin Badgers rowing team for several weeks before a race with the Delaware Boat Club of Chicago. With Marston coaching, Wisconsin was able beat the Delaware Boat Club. A team of older, more experienced rowers that beat the Badgers the year before. Marston was later replaced the following season by Andrew M. O'Dea.
