= Dad Vail Regatta =

Rowing competition in the United States

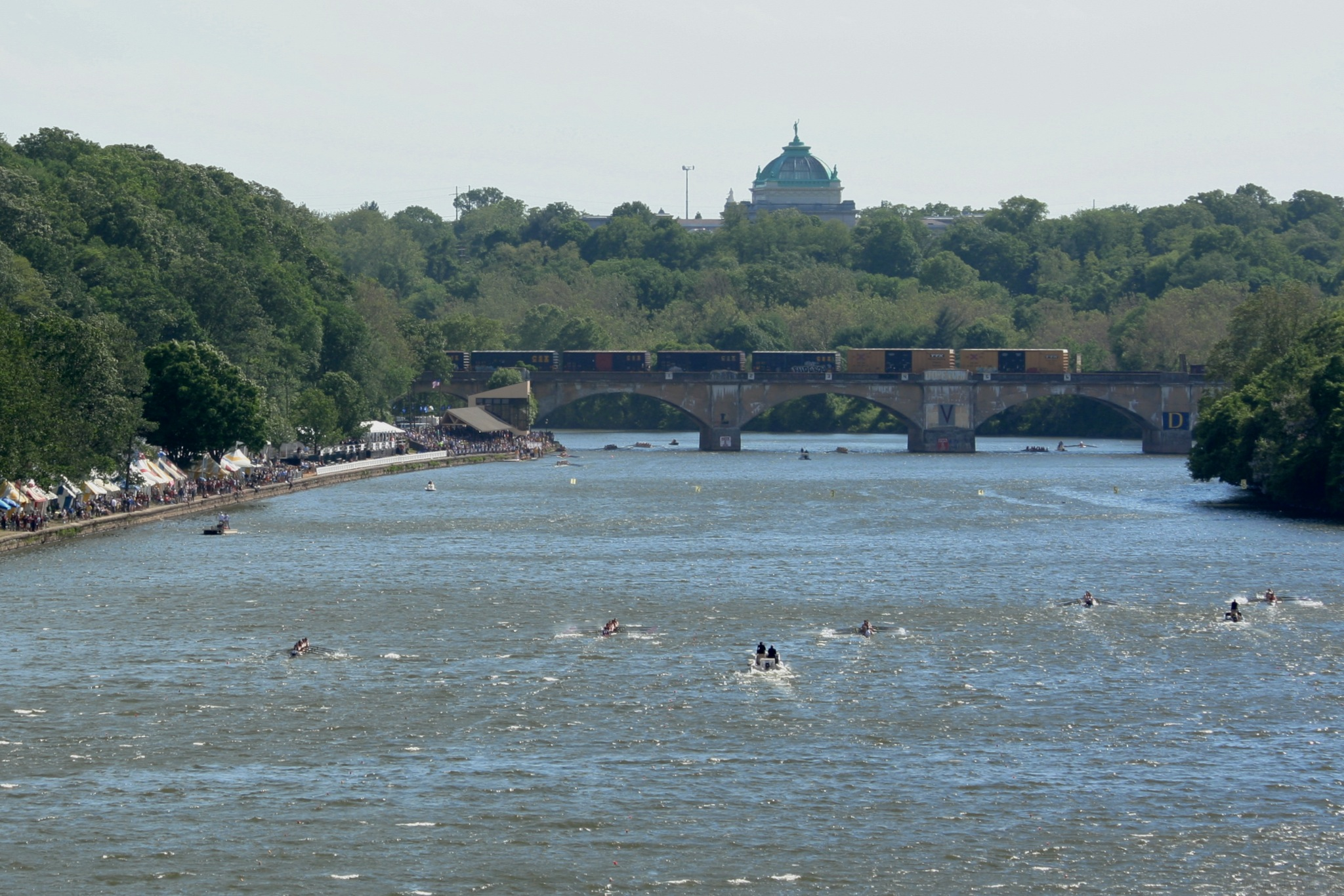
Men's Varsity Heavyweight Eight Open Second Final, 2010

The Dad Vail Regatta is the largest regular intercollegiate rowing event in the United States, drawing over a hundred colleges and universities from North America. The regatta has been held annually on the Schuylkill River in Philadelphia, Pennsylvania, since 1953.

Since 2019, the regatta has been sponsored by Thomas Jefferson University, a private university in Philadelphia, Pennsylvania, and is officially known as the Jefferson Dad Vail Regatta. Previous sponsors have included Aberdeen Asset Management (2010–15), and Sunoco (1998–2000).

The purposes of the Dad Vail Rowing Association are: "to perpetuate the 'Dad' Vail tradition, foster and encourage intercollegiate rowing among colleges new to the sport, and promote schedules for member schools."

== Origin of the name "Dad Vail" ==
The regatta was named after Harry Emerson "Dad" Vail, for his years of coaching at the University of Wisconsin–Madison.

The story of the Dad Vail Regatta, and of the Rowing Association, begins with two men, "Rusty" Callow, then coach at the University of Pennsylvania, who came up with the idea, and Lev Brett, who made the idea a reality.

Callow originated the idea of promoting competition among colleges struggling to found rowing programs. These included schools too small to hope to ever compete in major races and larger institutions not yet ready for such competition. In order to create competition, Rusty created a trophy as the competition prize, in 1934, which was named in honor of Vail.

Since then, the name "Dad" Vail has become one and the same with the race. Vail's passion for rowing helped form the modern-day Dad Vail Regatta and motivate the multitudes of colleges to come compete.

== History of the regatta ==
The first race, before the formation of the Dad Vail Rowing Association, was held in 1934 with "Rusty" and the University of Pennsylvania as hosts. Marietta College, coached by Ellis MacDonald won the first leg on the new trophy by finishing second to a Penn sub-varsity boat, which was an added entry. Rutgers, coached by Ned Ten Eyck, was third and Manhattan College, coached by "Skippy" Walz was fourth.

The race in 1935 was at Marietta. With the addition of Rollins College and Wisconsin, the order at the finish of the race was: Rutgers, Penn, Marietta, Wisconsin, Manhattan, and Rollins. There was no race held in 1937. In both 1936 and 1938, only Rutgers and Manhattan competed on the Harlem. Rutgers won both times. In February 1939, a meeting was held and the Dad Vail Rowing Association was formed in order to help promote the race and encourage schools to compete.

The first regatta organized by the Dad Vail Rowing Association, in 1939, involved seven colleges racing on the North Shrewsbury River in Red Bank, NJ. After bouncing around between the Connecticut River, Ohio River, Charles River, and Hudson River, in 1953 the regatta settled on the Schuylkill River along Philadelphia's Boathouse Row. The event slowly began to grow with a then record 10 colleges participating in 1955, to 20 colleges in 1961, and in 2012 crews from 132 colleges and universities across the United States and Canada competed in Philadelphia. However, from this high water mark participation began to wane and by 2024, collegiate participation plummeted by over half to 63 teams attending the regatta in its new home in Pennsauken, NJ.

Like most of intercollegiate athletics prior to the 1970s, the regatta was strictly a men's event. However, as the sports landscape changed began changing following Title IX, so too did the Dad Vail Regatta. Women competed for the first time at the regatta in 1973, albeit in "unofficial" races. The Dad Vail Regatta Association staged 2 half-mile races for women, with the Vesper Boat Club prevailing in the women's eights, and the Philadelphia Rowing Club winning in the women's coxed fours. In 1974 Allison Pacha became the first women to win a gold medal at the regatta when she coxed the Florida Institute of Technology men's shell to victory in the coxed-fours race. She was joined later that day by Sue Joyce who coxed the St. Joseph's College (PA) shell to a win in the junior varsity eights race for the Ernie Bayer Trophy. Women's teams began competing officially in 1976, with Ithaca College winning the inaugural Evelyn Bergman Trophy as victor in the women's varsity eights race, and Western Ontario claiming the coxed fours crown.

Briefly in late 2009, the Dad Vail Organizing Committee announced that the regatta would be held in Rumson, New Jersey in 2010, citing loss of local sponsors. However, this decision was soon rescinded due to pressure from the city and logistical problems with the Rumson location, and the event returned to Philadelphia for 2010.

The Dad Vail entered its 75th year in 2013.

In 2023, because of dredging being done on the Schuylkill River, the regatta was moved to the Cooper River in Pennsauken Township NJ. The event was also scheduled again for 2024 for the Cooper River, the 85th anniversary of the Dad Vail

== Winners of select events ==
	Men's HW 8+	Men's JV 8+	Men's Frosh 8+	Ref.
1934	Marietta	--	--	
1935	Rutgers	--	--	
1936	Rutgers	--	--	
1937	Not contested			
1938	Rutgers	Rutgers	no contest (Note: The Freshman Eights race between Rutgers and Manhattan was ended in a "no contest" after the boats' oars got interlocked and the Rutgers boat cut across the bow on the Manhattan boat resulting in a hole in the stern of the Rutgers shell.)	
1939	Rutgers	Manhattan	Rutgers	
1940	Rutgers	Rutgers	Rutgers	
1941	Rutgers	American International	Rutgers	
1942	Rutgers	--	Rutgers	
1943	Not contested (World War II)			
1944	Not contested (World War II)			
1945	Not contested (World War II)			
1946	Not contested (World War II)			
1947	Boston U.	Rutgers	--	
1948	Boston U.	Boston U.	Boston U.	
1949	Boston U.	Boston U.	Boston U.	
1950	Boston U.	Dartmouth	Boston U.	
1951	La Salle	Dartmouth	American International	
1952	La Salle	Dartmouth	--	
1953	La Salle	Dartmouth	Dartmouth (Note: The freshman eights race took place with Dartmouth and the Vesper Boat Club as the only two entrants. While Vesper finished 5.9 seconds ahead of Dartmouth, because they were not a collegiate team, the Lev Brett Bowl and official win was given to Dartmouth.)	
1954	Dartmouth	Dartmouth	--	
1955	Dartmouth	Dartmouth	Dartmouth	
1956	La Salle	Rollins	La Salle (Note: La Salle's freshman eights team was given the Lev Brett Bowl and official win as they were the only qualifying collegiate team in the race. However, they did compete against the Penn junior varsity heavy freshmen eights team in a race which the latter won by 24 seconds.)	
1957	La Salle	Rollins	La Salle	
1958	La Salle	Purdue	La Salle	
1959	Brown	La Salle	St. Joseph's (PA)	
1960	Brown	St. Joseph's (PA)	Brown	
1961	Brown	Brown	Brown	
1962	Georgetown	Georgetown	La Salle	
1963	Marietta	Georgetown	Fordham	
1964	Georgetown	Rollins	Marietta	
1965	Northeastern	Northeastern	Northeastern	
1966	Marietta	Marietta	Marietta	
1967	Marietta	Georgetown	Marietta	
1968	Georgetown	Marietta	Marietta	
1969	Georgetown	Marietta	Marietta	
1970	St. Joseph's (PA)	Georgetown	Trinity College	
	Men's HW 8+	Men's JV 8+	Men's Frosh 8+	

	Men's HW 8+	Men's JV 8+	Men's Frosh 8+	Men's LW 8+	Men's FLW 8+	Women's HW 8+	Women's LW 8+	Women's DII HW 8+	Women's DIII HW 8+	Ref.
1971	Georgetown	Marietta	Marietta	Marietta	--	--	--	--	--	
1972	Coast Guard	Marietta	Marist	Coast Guard	--	--	--	--	--	
1973	Massachusetts	Marietta	Marietta	Marietta	Coast Guard	-- (Note: Two unofficial women's half-mile races were contested at the regatta. The Vesper Boat Club won the women's eights, and the Philadelphia Rowing Club won women's four with coxswain.)	--	--	--	
1974	Massachusetts	St. Joseph's (PA)	Massachusetts	Drexel	Marietta	--	--	--	--	
1975	Coast Guard	Coast Guard	Florida Tech	Florida Tech	Fordham	--	--	--	--	
1976	Coast Guard	Marietta	Marietta	Coast Guard	Trinity College	Ithaca	--	--	--	
1977	Coast Guard	Coast Guard	Ithaca	La Salle	Trinity	Western Ontario	--	--	--	
1978	Coast Guard	Coast Guard	Marietta	Toronto	Coast Guard	Wesleyan	--	--	--	
1979	Coast Guard	Massachusetts	Florida Tech	Western Ontario	Trinity College	Ithaca	--	--	--	
1980	Massachusetts	Coast Guard	Florida Tech	Trinity College	Georgetown	Trinity College	--	--	--	
1981	Coast Guard	Florida Tech	Coast Guard	Trinity College	San Diego State	Western Ontario	--	--	--	
1982	Florida Tech	Florida Tech	Coast Guard	British Columbia	Rhode Island	Western Ontario	--	--	--	
1983	Temple	Florida Tech	Coast Guard	Florida Tech	Marietta	Georgetown	--	--	--	
1984	Temple	Coast Guard	Florida Tech	Rhode Island	Coast Guard	Minnesota	--	--	--	
1985	Temple	Florida Tech	Georgetown	Coast Guard	New Hampshire	New Hampshire	--	--	--	
1986	Temple	Florida Tech	Georgetown	New Hampshire	Georgetown	New Hampshire	Lowell	--	--	
1987	Temple	Temple	Florida Tech	Florida Tech	Georgetown	Georgetown	George Washington	--	--	
1988	Florida Tech	New Hampshire	New Hampshire	Georgetown	Massachusetts	Minnesota	Cincinnati	--	--	
1989	Temple	Temple	Coast Guard	Georgetown	Georgetown	Western Ontario	Washington U.	--	--	
1990	Temple	Virginia	Temple	Georgetown	Ithaca	Western Ontario	George Washington	--	--	
1991	Temple	Temple	Connecticut	Rochester	Marietta	Virginia	Central Florida	--	--	
1992	Temple	Georgetown	Georgetown	Western Ontario	Fordham	Navy	Florida Tech	--	--	
1993	Temple	Temple	University of Miami	Western Ontario	Delaware	Georgetown	Western Ontario	--	--	
1994	Temple	result unknown	Pittsburgh	Marietta	Delaware	Temple	Central Florida	--	--	
1995	Temple	Michigan	Georgetown	Toronto	Vanderbilt	Michigan	Central Florida	--	--	
1996	Temple	Temple	Purdue	Florida Tech	Villanova	Temple	Villanova	--	--	
1997	Temple	Drexel	Drexel	St. Joseph's (PA)	Purdue	Western Ontario	Villanova	--	--	
1998	Temple	Temple	Purdue	Florida Tech	Villanova	Purdue	Villanova	--	--	
1999	Temple	Temple	Marietta	St. Joseph's (PA)	St. Joseph's (PA)	Villanova	Delaware	--	--	
2000	Temple	RIT	Villanova	Purdue	Georgia Tech	Villanova	Massachusetts	--	--	
2001	Temple	Temple	Marietta	Villanova	Santa Clara	Boston College	Delaware	--	--	
2002	Dowling	Marietta	Marietta	Fordham	Minnesota	Massachusetts	Delaware	--	--	
2003	Temple	Temple	St. Joseph's (PA)	Delaware	St. Joseph's (PA)	Massachusetts	Bucknell	--	--	
2004	Temple	Temple	Marietta	Boston College	St. Joseph's (PA)	Sacramento State	Purdue	Marietta		
2005	Michigan	St. Joseph's (PA)	Purdue	Boston College	St. Joseph's (PA)	Connecticut	Dayton	Barry		
2006	Marietta	Temple	St. Joseph's (PA)	Georgia Tech	St. Joseph's (PA)	St. Joseph's (PA)	Dayton	Barry		
2007	Purdue	Temple	Bucknell	Georgia Tech	Florida Tech	Purdue	Ohio State	Dowling		
2008	Purdue	Grand Valley	Delaware	Fordham	Delaware	UC Davis	Central Florida	Dowling		
2009	Michigan	Temple	Michigan	Delaware	MSOE	Grand Valley	Bucknell	Mercyhurst		
2010	Brock	Drexel	St. Joseph's (PA)	Mercyhurst	Michigan St.	Sacramento State	Massachusetts	Mercyhurst	Vassar	
2011	Michigan	Virginia	Purdue	Mercyhurst	Purdue	Purdue	Bucknell	Mercyhurst	Marietta	
2012	Michigan	Michigan	Marietta	Mercyhurst	Delaware	Duke	Bucknell	Mercyhurst	Marietta	
2013	Drexel	Michigan	Drexel	Delaware	Delaware	Grand Valley	Bucknell	Barry	Rochester	
2014	Michigan	Drexel	Jacksonville	MIT	Brock	Massachusetts	MIT	Nova Southeastern	Marietta	
2015	Florida Tech	Drexel	Drexel	Delaware	Mercyhurst	Massachusetts	MIT	Barry	Marietta	
2016	Florida Tech	Drexel	Drexel	Mercyhurst	--	Massachusetts	MIT	Barry	Ithaca	
2017	Drexel	St. Joseph's (PA)	Drexel	Delaware	--	Drexel	Boston U.	Central Oklahoma	--	
2018	Temple	Temple	Temple	Mercyhurst	--	Boston U.	--	UC San Diego	Coast Guard	
2019	Colgate	Drexel	Drexel	Mercyhurst	--	Boston U.	Georgetown	Florida Tech	Vassar	
2020	Not contested (Pandemic)									
2021	Temple	George Washington	Temple	Mercyhurst	--	Drexel	--	Mercyhurst	Stockton	
2022	Drexel	Drexel	Temple	MIT	--	Princeton	Georgetown	Mercyhurst	Bryn Mawr	
2023	Drexel	Drexel	Drexel	MIT	--	Boston U.	--	Embry Riddle	Stockton	
2024	Drexel	Temple	West Point	MIT	--	Drexel	Georgetown	Mercyhurst	RIT	
2025	Temple	Temple	Temple	--	--	Drexel	--	Rollins	Catholic	

== Points trophies ==
The Jack Bratten Trophy was created in 1967 to recognize the best overall team at the regatta based on how well their boats performed across all of the various races. Originally, the award only recognized the men's team, as women did not compete in the Dad Vail Regatta. However, in 1976, when women's events were first officially contested, the points won by both the men's and women's team were combined to determine the best overall team. In 1986, the Dr. Thomas Kerr Trophy and the Nancy J. Seitz Trophy (later renamed the Jack & Nancy Seitz Trophy) were awarded to the best Men's and Women's teams respectively, base on accumulated points in the various races. In 2024 the overall points trophy was renamed the Bratten-Galloway Trophy, in recognition of Jack Galloway who served as the regatta's president (1977-2001) and chairman (2001-present).

Year	Bratten Trophy; Overall Points	Year	Bratten Trophy; Overall Points	Kerr Trophy; Men's Points	Seitz Trophy; Women's Points	Year	Bratten Trophy; Overall Points	Kerr Trophy; Men's Points	Seitz Trophy; Women's Points
1967	Marietta	1986	?	FIT	New Hampshire	2006	St. Joseph's	St. Joseph's	Massachusetts
1968	Georgetown	1987	FIT	FIT	Navy	2007	Purdue	Purdue	Ohio St.
1969	Georgetown	1988	Georgetown	FIT	Navy	2008	Purdue	Delaware	Buffalo
1970	Georgetown	1989	Georgetown	Georgetown	Navy	2009	Delaware / Buffalo	Delaware / Michigan	Buffalo
1971	St. Joseph's	1990	Georgetown	Georgetown	Navy	2010	St. Joseph's	Delaware	Buffalo
1972	Coast Guard	1991	Georgetown	Georgetown	Navy	2011	Purdue	Purdue	Michigan
1973	Marietta	1992	Georgetown	Georgetown	Navy	2012	Purdue	Michigan	Bucknell
1974	Coast Guard	1993	Georgetown	Georgetown	Georgetown	2013	Drexel	Drexel	Grand Valley
1975	Coast Guard	1994	Temple	?	?	2014	Drexel	Michigan	Massachusetts
1976	Coast Guard	1995	Michigan	Drexel	Michigan	2015	Drexel	Drexel	Massachusetts
1977	Coast Guard	1996	Temple	Temple	Temple	2016	Drexel	Michigan	Massachusetts
1978	Coast Guard	1997	Villanova	Drexel	Villanova	2017	Drexel	Delaware	Drexel
1979	Trinity College	1998	Villanova	Purdue	Villanova	2018	Drexel	Delaware	Drexel
1980	Coast Guard	1999	Villanova	St. Joseph's	Villanova	2019	Temple	Drexel	Temple
1981	Trinity College	2000	Purdue	Purdue	Massachusetts	2020	Not contested		
1982	FIT	2001	Purdue	Purdue	Delaware	2021	Drexel	Temple	Princeton
1983	Georgetown	2002	Boston Coll. / Purdue	Marietta	Villanova	2022	Drexel	Drexel	Princeton
1984	New Hampshire	2003	Purdue	Purdue / St. Joseph's	Purdue	2023	Temple	Drexel	Bowdin / MIT (tie)
1985	New Hampshire	2004	Purdue	Purdue	Purdue	2024	Drexel	Drexel	Georgetown
		2005	St. Joseph's	St. Joseph's	Connecticut	2025	Drexel	Drexel	Georgetown

== See also ==
- Boathouse Row
- Sports in Philadelphia
