= Wisconsin Badgers Crew =

Rowing teams of the University of Wisconsin-Madison

- Founded: 1874; 152 years ago
- University: University of Wisconsin–Madison
- Affiliations: NCAA Division I
- Website: Men's; Women's

The Wisconsin Badgers Crew is the rowing team that represents the University of Wisconsin–Madison. Rowing at the University dates back to 1874. The women's openweight team is an NCAA Division I team. The men's and lightweight women's programs compete at the Intercollegiate Rowing Association (IRA) Championship Regatta because the NCAA does not sanction a men's or lightweight women's national championship. Beau Hoopman has been the men's head coach since 2023 and Victoria "Vicky" Opitz has been the women's varsity coach from 2023 to the present.

== History ==
The first crew is believed to have set out on Lake Mendota in 1874, though the only evidence of this is a letter written in 1912 by a Wisconsin alumnus. By 1878 rowing had become an intramural sport at the university. Affectionately nicknamed "the Naval Department", the crew had a boathouse and first represented the University of Wisconsin competitively by 1893 and secured its first coach in 1894. In addition to gymnasium conditioning, early rowers used the Yahara River for training. Having no collegiate competitors in the Midwest, the crew started attending regattas in the East starting in 1896, but were denied entry to the Intercollegiate Rowing Association. The Wisconsin freshmen eight won their event's national championship in 1900, the first national championship win for the rowing team. Since then, the Wisconsin crew has won 48 Intercollegiate Rowing Association titles.

The men's varsity eight won its first IRA national championship in 1951, the first of nine such titles. The 1990 win brought an invitation to the Henley Royal Regatta, the fourth visit for Wisconsin. The Wisconsin varsity eight has placed in the top three spots at the IRA National Championship Regatta 20 times since 1950, an achievement only surpassed by the University of Washington. In 2008, the Badgers' varsity eight won the IRA national championship over second-place Washington by 1.72 seconds, capping off an undefeated season.

Wisconsin's women first began actively competing the Winter/Spring of 1972 as a club sport. After a winter of conditioning, they unofficially beat the national record, in their very first race. Fall of that year, they headed to Boston, for The Head of the Charles Regatta, where they took 2nd place. At that time, the National Women’s Rowing Association championship served as the national championship for collegiate boats. The women's varsity eight won the club title in 1975, and was the highest placed collegiate boat in 1976, 1977, and 1978. In 1986, the Wisconsin women won the National Collegiate Championship, which first began in 1981. In 2009 the varsity four were runners-up at the D-1 NCAA championships. This was the highest-ever finish for a Wisconsin boat in the history of the NCAA championships.

During the 2010 season, the openweight women won the school's first Big Ten Conference rowing championship, held in Laingsburg, Michigan. The team won four of the six events (1st and 2nd novice 8, varsity 4, and second varsity 8) and finished 2nd in the varsity 8 and 3rd in second varsity four.

== Location ==
Wisconsin's three-story boathouse is located on the southern shore of Lake Mendota in Madison, Wisconsin. The Porter Boathouse spans 50,000 square feet (5,000 m^{2}) and was completed in the spring of 2005. It includes a moving water rowing tank for 24 athletes, five boat bays (including one repair bay) with storage for 100 rowing shells, coaches' offices, and locker rooms for each team. The Porter Boathouse was named in recognition of a donation by the Ben and Cheslee Porter Family for over $1 million toward the facility.

The team's first boathouse, located in front of the Red Gym, stood from 1893 through 1968. The 1967 boathouse, completed in 1967, was located at the site of the current (Porter) boathouse. The 1967 boathouse housed the team's activities until 2003, when construction on the Porter Boathouse began.

== Men's varsity coaches ==
- Amos W. Marston – 1894
- Andrew M. O'Dea – 1895–1898
- Curran C. McConville – 1899
- Andrew M. O'Dea – 1900–1906
- Edward H. Ten Eyck – 1907–1910
- Harry E. "Dad" Vail – 1911–1928
- George W. "Mike" Murphy – 1929–1934
- Ralph Hunn – 1935–1940
- Allen W. "Skip" Walz – 1941–1942
- George A. Rea – 1943
- Curt P. Drewes – 1944–1945
- Allen W. "Skip" Walz – 1946
- Norm Sonju – 1947–1968
- Randal T. "Jabo" Jablonic – 1969–1997
- Chris H. Clark – 1997–2023
- Beau Hoopman – 2023 – present

== Women's varsity coaches ==
- Jay Mimier – 1974–1979
- Sue Ela – 1979–1985
- Sue Ela & Jane Ludwig – 1985–1986
- Sue Ela – 1986–1997
- Mary Browning – 1997–2003
- Maren LaLiberty – 2002 effective August 1. LaLiberty has been head women's lightweight coach at the school for three years and replaces Mary Browning.
- Sue Ela – 2003–2004
- Bebe Bryans – 2004–2023
- Victoria "Vicky" Opitz – 2023–Present

== National championships ==
=== Men's Varsity Eight ===
1951, 1959, 1966, 1973, 1974, 1975, 1986, 1990, 2008

=== Men's Second Varsity Eight ===
1973, 1974, 1986

=== Men's Freshman Eight ===
1900, 1907, 1964, 1972, 1973, 1979, 1983, 1985

=== Men's Varsity Four ===
1976, 1981, 1982, 1983, 1987, 1990, 1999, 2000

=== Women's Varsity Eight ===
1975, 1976, 1977, 1978, 1986

=== Women's Lightweight Eight ===
2004, 2005, 2006, 2008, 2009

=== Women's Lightweight Four ===
2011, 2012, 2013, 2014, 2016

=== Women's Lightweight Double ===
2015

== Notable Regatta Results ==
=== NCAA Division I championships ===
- Women's Varsity Four – Runners Up 2009
- Women's Second Varsity Eight – 3rd Place 2006
- Women's Varsity Four – 3rd Place 2010

=== National Collegiate Rowing Championship ===
- Men's: 1986, 1990

=== NCAA South/Central regionals ===
- Women's Novice Eight – 2008
- Women's Novice Eight (Second Place) – 2009
- Women's Novice Eight (First Place)- 2010

=== Big Ten championship ===
- Women's Second Varsity Eight – 2008
- Women's 1st Novice Eight – 2008
- Women's 2nd Novice Eight – 2008
- Women's 1st Novice Eight – 2009
- Women's 2nd Novice Eight – 2009
- Women's 2nd Varsity Four – 2009
- Women's 2nd Varsity Eight – 2010
- Women's 1st Varsity Four – 2010
- Women's 1st Novice Eight – 2010
- Women's 2nd Novice Eight – 2010
- Big Ten Team Champions – 2010
- Women's 2nd Novice Eight- 2012

=== Eastern Sprints ===
- Men's Freshman Eight – 2000
- Men's 2nd Freshman Eight – 2000, 2011, 2012, 2013, 2014, 2015
- Men's Varsity Eight – 1946, 2002, 2008
- Men's 2nd Varsity Eight – 1987, 2001, 2007, 2008, 2012
- Men's 3rd Varsity Eight – 2000, 2001, 2002, 2003, 2006, 2009, 2010, 2011

=== Head of the Charles Regatta ===
- Women's Club Fours – 1998, 2014
- Women's Youth Fours – 1992
- Women's Lightweight Eight – 2000, 2001, 2009, 2010, 2011
- Men's Championship Eight – 1966, 1972, 1973
- Men's Championship Four – 2009, 2011
- Women's Championship Eight – 1977, 1978, 1979, 1988

=== Midwest Rowing Championship ===
- Men's Varsity Eight – 1973–1980, 1983–2006

=== American Heritage Regatta ===
- Men's Collegiate Eight – 2007
- Men's Novice Eight – 2007
- Men's Novice Four w/coxswain – 2007

== Cups and trophies ==
=== Cochrane Cup ===
1963, 1964, 1967, 1969, 1971, 1973–1977, 1980, 1981, 1984–1991, 1996, 1998–2000, 2002, 2008

=== Walsh Cup ===
1967–1969, 1985–1989, 1997–2002, 2008

=== Ten Eyck Trophy ===
1972–1975, 1979, 1980, 1986–1988, 1997, 1999–2002

== Notable Alumni and Former Athletes ==
- Maddie Wanamaker – 2020 and 2024 Olympian
- Sophia Vitas – 2024 Olympian
- Grace Joyce – 2024 Olympian
- Lauren O'Connor – 2024 Olympian
- Grace Latz – 2016 Olympian
- Victoria Opitz – 2016 + 2020 Olympic alternate, present head women's coach
- Kristin Hedstrom – 2012 Olympian
- Beau Hoopman – 2008 Olympian and present head men's coach
- Jack Turco – Carnivore diet influencer known as "Butter Dawg"
