= Cochrane Cup =

US rowing competition

The Cochrane Cup has been competed for since 1961 by the Men's Varsity Eight rowing teams of Dartmouth College, Massachusetts Institute of Technology, and Wisconsin.

The cup was placed in competition by Mrs. Edward Cochrane in 1961 for heavyweight races among Dartmouth, MIT and Wisconsin. The cup is named after Admiral Edward L. Cochrane, former president of M.I.T., and director of the Navy's Bureau of Ships. After one race of one mile (1961), one of 1.75 miles (1962) and another of two miles (1963), the cup has been raced on a 2000-meter course ever since.

The cup is named after Adm. Edward L. Cochrane of the Navy's Bureau of Ships who is a former president of MIT.

== Winners ==
In 1972, it was won by MIT.

In 2017, it was won by the University of Wisconsin–Madison.
