= Harry Vail =

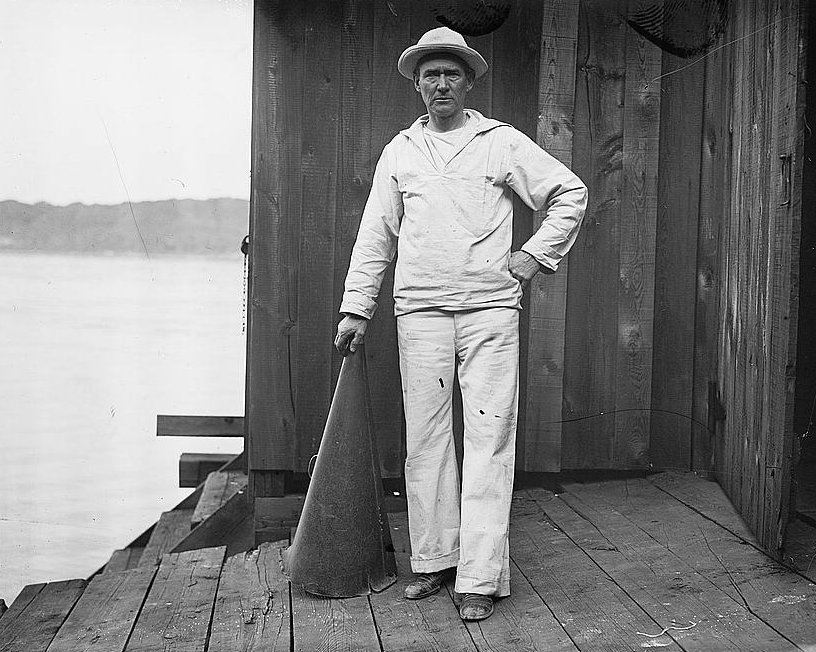
Vail in 1913

Harry Emerson "Dad" Vail, was a rowing (crew) coach at the University of Wisconsin–Madison, United States. The Dad Vail Regatta, held annually in Philadelphia, Pennsylvania, is named in his honor.

Harry Emerson Vail was born in Gagetown, New Brunswick, Canada.

His career is traced in his obituary, which was published in the Wisconsin State Journal on October 8, 1928. It read:

Mr. Vail, aged 69, was the oldest crew coach in the U.S. at the time of his death. Jim Ten Eyck of Syracuse was the only one who exceeded "Dad" in age. Coach Vail was "Dad" to every boy who ever worked under him, and he was one of the most beloved figures on the university campus.

Coming to Wisconsin in 1911, Coach Vail almost won the Poughkeepsie title that year. Again in 1924, following a ten-year period in which the University of Wisconsin authorities refused to send the crew east, "Dad" took second, and his praises were sung from one end of the country to the other.

Deeply religious, "Dad" Vail was one of the few coaches taking crews to Poughkeepsie who refused to do any rowing on Sunday. Gradually, other coaches followed the lead of the Wisconsin mentor and until now it is quite unusual to see an eight swinging down the Hudson on Sunday.

Coach Vail was possessed of an inimitable sense of humor, and some of his stories will survive as long as eights with the long sweeps are propelled over Lake Mendota. As long as rowing is discussed, there will be those to tell of the feats of "Dad" Vail when he was one of the greatest single scullers in the world, of his uncanny ability in sizing up a crew, and of his flashes of biting sarcasm.

Previous to his work at Wisconsin, Coach Vail had been coach at Georgetown Prep, Ariel Boat Club, and Harvard. However, it was through his work at Wisconsin that Coach Vail became widely known.

He died in his native Canada.
