= Walsh Cup (rowing) =

The Walsh Cup has been competed for since 1967 by the U.S. Naval Academy and Wisconsin Men's Varsity Eight rowing teams. Both teams compete in the Eastern Association of Rowing Colleges (EACR).

It is named after Commander Charles "Buck" Walsh, former coach of the U.S. Naval Academy crew.
