= F. D. Colson =

American amateur rower, rowing coach and lawyer

Frederick D. Colson
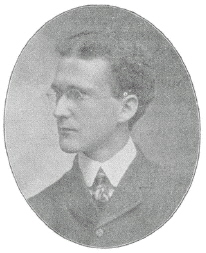
- Frederick D. Colson c. 1903
- Born: September 5, 1875 Registration State: New York; Roll: 1711817; Draft Board: 3 Buffalo, Erie, New York
- Died: May 6, 1958
- Education: Cornell University (B.L., LL.B.)
- Occupations: Amateur Rower; Lawyer; Rowing coach Professor; Librarian
- Employer(s): Cornell University; Harvard University; State of New York
- Spouse: Edna (McNary) Colson
- Parent(s): Frederick Augustus Colson (1835-1904) and Mary E. Baylis (1848- )

Frederick D. Colson (September 5, 1875 – May 6, 1958) was a nationally known American amateur rower, rowing coach and lawyer. As a student at Cornell University he rowed for Coach Charles E. Courtney in several of the Cornell Navy's most noted races. During his coaching career he was Courtney's top assistant coach at Cornell as well Harvard University head rowing coach in 1904. After coaching he dedicated himself to public service including being the State of New York law librarian, and Deputy and Assistant Attorney General of New York.

== Cornell University ==
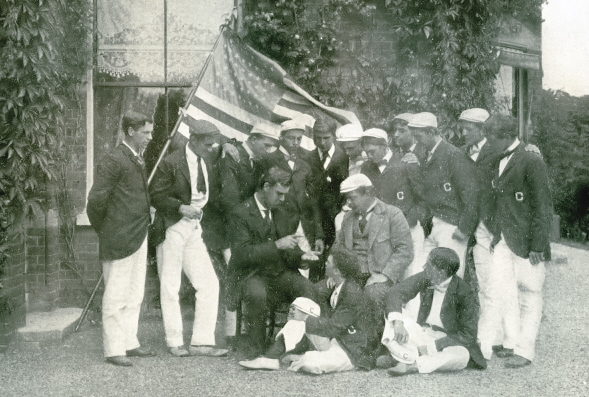
Cornell's 1895 Henley Royal Regatta Varsity Crew. Colson on ground (left)

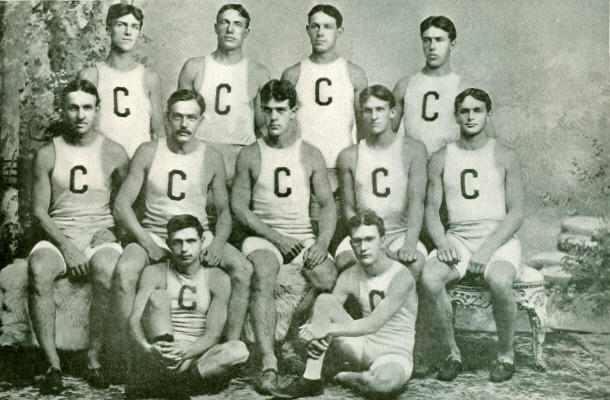
1898 Cornell Varsity 8 oared Rowing Team. Colson on ground (right)

Colson started Cornell University in the fall of 1893. After rowing for the freshman crew in the summer of 1894, he made the Cornell varsity eight-oared team in his sophomore year under Coach Charles E. Courtney. That year he rowed in the Grand Challenge Cup at the Henley Royal Regatta in England. The following year he was part of the crew that defeated Harvard, Pennsylvania and Columbia at Intercollegiate Rowing Association Championship regatta in Poughkeepsie, New York. In his senior year Colson was coxswain of the crew which defeated Yale and Harvard at Poughkeepsie on June 24, 1897 and Pennsylvania and Columbia on the same course less than two weeks later. Colson was elected to the Sphinx Head Society, Cornell's oldest senior honor society. He graduated in the spring of 1897, but returned to Cornell in the fall of 1898 to study law. That school year he captained the crew which defeated Yale and Harvard at New London, Connecticut.

== Coach ==
Colson graduated from Cornell with a law degree and practiced law for two years in Buffalo, New York. He then returned to Cornell to become instructor in procedure in the law school and assistant coach of the rowing team under Courtney. As the assistant coach, his main responsibility was to development of the freshman eight-oared crew. In 1904 Colson coached the Harvard University varsity crew. To coach at Harvard he received a leave of absence from Cornell for the spring term. In addition to coaching, he did research work and attended lectures in the Harvard law school. In Harvard's annual intercollegiate regatta on the Thames with Yale. Colson's Harvard crew split the two races, Yale capturing the eight-oared four-mile race by eight boat lengths, while Harvard took the four-oared two-mile race by a length after a Yale rower broke his oarlock. In the fall of 1904 Colson resumed his duties on the Cornell Law School faculty and his work with Coach Courtney.

Colson coached at Cornell until 1907. During his time as Courtney's assistant Cornell won several Intercollegiate Rowing Association National Championship as well as freshman National Championships in 1902, 1903, and 1905.

== Legal career ==
In the fall of 1908, Colson was appointed law librarian in the State Library in Albany, New York. With the appointment Colson resigned from the faculty of Cornell. After leaving the library he continued to dedicated himself to public service including being the Clerk of the State Court of Claims, (1915-1924); Deputy and Assistant Attorney General of New York, (1925-1931); and First Deputy State Reporter Court of Appeals (1931-1945).
