= Ward brothers (rowers) =

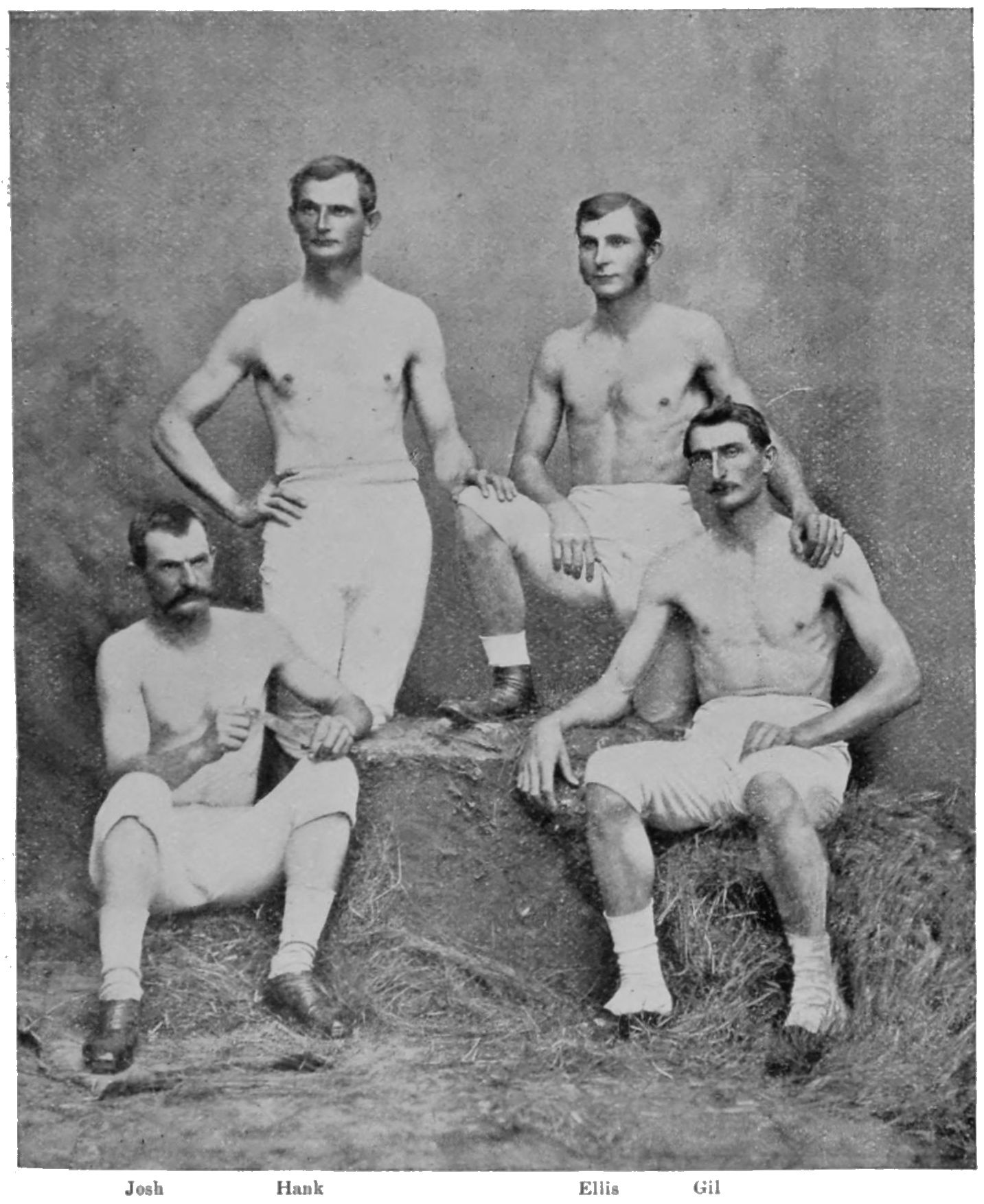
Photo of the Ward Brothers from the 1899 book How to Get Strong and How to Stay So

The Ward brothers were four members of one family who rowed, sometimes forming four and two-man crews and sometimes individually. They were declared World Champions after a four-oared race in 1871.

== Ward family ==
The four brothers were part of a large family; nine sons and five daughters were born to Isaac and Winifred Ward. The children were born at Middle Hope, New York. Isaac Ward was a proprietor of fishing vessels, sloops, and schooners along the Hudson River. He taught his sons watercraft skills and four of them became particularly adept at rowing. These were;

William Henry, b 1827, known as ‘Hank’,

Charles, b 1831

Joshua, b 1838, known as ‘Josh’,

Gilbert, b 1841,

Additionally another son, Ellis Ward, b 1846, sometimes shared the honours if one of the others was unavailable. Later he went on to coach rowing for some forty years at the University of Pennsylvania.

Joshua was proficient at the single sculls and after a number of early races he was good enough to win the American Sculling Championship in 1859 and 1863. He won numerous other races and his backers hoped he would row against Robert Chambers, champion of England at the time, but the race never happened.

== Rowing records ==
1857: JULY 4 Newburgh N. Y., Regatta. Josh Ward (age 19) and Hank Ward (29) row “Fanny Fern”, winning double scull race by a stroke or two.

1858: SEPT. 15 Newburgh Regatta. Josh Ward wins his first single scull match, rowing against John Hancon: 2 miles, in 16 minutes 7 seconds (16:7), won by two lengths.

1859: OCT. 4 Staten Island Regatta. Josh becomes Champion Single Sculler of America, winning Tiffany solid silver championship belt: 5 mile race with a turn halfway, in 35:10.

1860: JULY 25 Citizens’ Regatta at Worcester, Mass. Josh wins single scull race. 2 miles, in 15:37. He also won in six oared race, rowing in “Banker” with George Shaw, R. Marvel, W. Tuttle, C. Shaw, P. Hunt: 3 miles, in 1837 the best time ever made by six oared crew on 3 mile course.

1861: SEPT. 2 At Cornwall, N. Y. Josh. wins first prize, defeating Radford (England), Grady (N. Y.), McKiel (Cold Spring), Hancon and Stevens.

1861: SEPT. 20 AT Poughkeepsie, N. Y. Josh wins single scull race: 5 miles, in 40:00.

1865: AUG., At Cornwall, N. Y. Josh defeats Hancon, Biglin, Grady, Radford (England), McKiel, Bergen and June.

1865 SEPT 25 Ward v Biglin The Biglin Brothers were challenged to a race on a five-mile course at Sing Sing by Josh Ward, who had organized four man team from his brothers, Gil, Charles, and Hank. The Wards beat the Biglin brothers for the professional four-oared championship of America.

1866: SEPT. 20 at Springfield, Mass. Josh wins single scull race against Walter Brown, Doyle and McKiel: 2 miles, in 15:59.

1867: SEPT. On Connecticut River at Springfield. Ward brothers Josh, Gilbert, Hank and Charles defeat Canadian crew from Saint John, New Brunswick: 3 miles to stake boat & return (6 miles), in 39:28. See also the Paris Crew.

1868: JULY 4, On Charles River at Boston. Ward brothers win six oared race, defeating the Saint John crew again and Harvard University crew.

1868: JULY, On Lake Quinsigamond at Worcester. Josh, Charles, Hank, Gilbert and Ellis Ward with Jere L. Raymond (Ossining) defeat Harvard crew again: 3 mile turning course (1.5 + 1.5), in 17:40 the fastest time ever made by a six oared crew over 3 mile turning course.

1871: SEPT. 11 International Regatta at Saratoga Lake, N.Y. Josh, Ellis, Hank and Gilbert Ward gain the world championship by defeating five other four oared crews: 2 miles & turn (4 miles), in 24:40 the fastest time ever made by a four oared crew over 4 miles.
