= Ellis Ward =

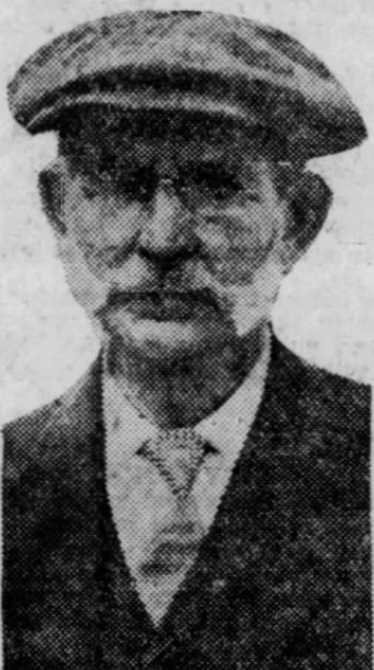
- Born: September 13, 1846; Newburgh, New York, U.S.
- Died: August 25, 1922 (aged 75); Philadelphia, Pennsylvania, U.S.
- Occupations: Rower, coach
- Employer: University of Pennsylvania

Ellis F. Ward (September 13, 1846 – August 25, 1922) was an American rower and coach best known for his time as the coach of the University of Pennsylvania rowing team. Ward was a member of one of the most famous families, the Ward Brothers, in the history of the sport of rowing and is a member of the Rowing Hall of Fame.

== Early life ==
Ward was born in Newburgh, New York on September 13, 1846, the son of Isaac and Winifred Ward. Ellis Ward grew up in a large family of rowing enthusiasts. Ward and his eight brothers rowed regularly in the Hudson River's Newburgh Bay from the 1850s through the 1870s.

== Championship rower ==
At age 17, Ellis took up competitive racing soon he joined three of his brothers (Ellis, Henry, Josh and Gilbert) to race as a team; included in their many wins included the 1865 professional four-oared championship of America with a hard-fought victory over the Biglin Brothers. They also won a and a world title in 1871 at Saratoga when Ellis and his brothers defeated two English and three American fours man boats in an international four mile turn race.

== Coaching career ==
Ward's first position in college coaching was in 1873 at Amherst College. This was one of many teams he coached during the 1870s and 1880s including a number of non-collegiate boat clubs, including the Columbia Boat Club in Washington, D.C., the Fairmount Boat Club of Philadelphia, and the Bohemian Boat Club of New York City. In 1879, Ward began coaching crew at Penn position he would hold off and on until 1912. In 1887 Ward resigned for the season because of controversy over the stroke he trained his athletes to use, but he returned the following season. Ward was replaced for the 1897 season by Samuel Powel, Jr.

=== Substitution controversy ===
Ward continued to coach Penn until 1892. Before the college championship of America, he felt the varsity was not giving their best efforts. Ward removed the entire varsity crew and the second string of eight rowers. Wards team of substitutes won the college championship of America, on Saratoga Lake. This controversy may have had something to do with his departure from Penn at about that time. Another factor may have been the university was starting to take over the funding and oversight of Penn athletics. Whatever the reason George Washington Woodruff became coach of both football and crew.

=== Return to Penn ===
From 1892 until 1895 Ward was also absent for a four-year period when he trained rowers at the Manhattan Athletic Club in New York City. Woodruff did not have enough time to supervise both sports and Ward was hired by the university in 1896.

=== Henley ===
The highlight of Ward's long tenure as coach was Penn's trip to 1901 at Henley Regatta. Ward had to change its strategy since the Penn Crew had to row a far shorter distance than they were used to. Ward's eight oared crew still won both of its trial heats at the regatta, but lost in the final to the Leander Club crew of London. That year, they were the only American eight man crew to mount a serious challenge to Britain's retention of the Grand Challenge Cup, the most prized trophy in amateur rowing.

== After coaching ==
Ward left his position as rowing coach in 1912. He supported himself and his wife Martha by working with his son making oars.

Ward died on August 25, 1922, in Philadelphia.
