= College rowing in the United States =

Team sport version of rowing practiced by universities in the United States

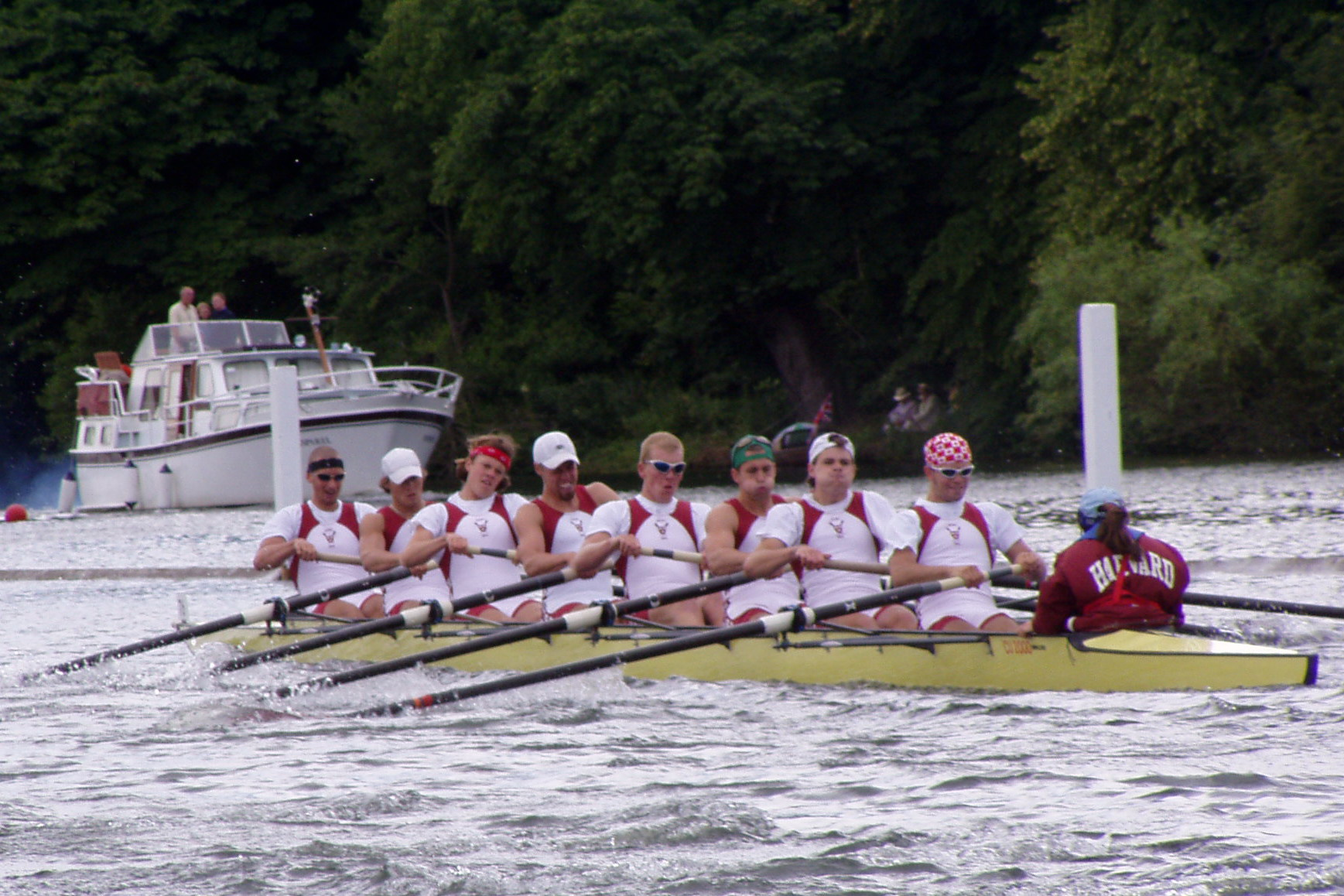
Harvard men's eight at Henley, 2004

Rowing is the oldest intercollegiate sport in college athletics in the United States. The first intercollegiate race was a contest between Yale and Harvard in 1852. In the 2018–19 school year, there were 2,340 male and 7,294 female collegiate rowers (on 57 and 148 teams, respectively) in Divisions I, II and III, according to the NCAA. The sport has grown since the first NCAA statistics were compiled for the 1981–82 school year, which reflected 2,053 male and 1,187 female collegiate rowers (on 48 and 43 teams, respectively) in the three divisions. Some concern has been raised that some recent female numbers are inflated by non-competing novices.

Men's rowing has organized collegiate championships in various forms since 1871 but is not an NCAA sponsored sport. There are two national championships for men's rowing: the Intercollegiate Rowing Association (IRA) and the American Collegiate Rowing Association (ACRA). The IRA, founded in 1891, served as the unified national championship until 2008. In 2007, the IRA stewards voted to require all participating teams to have varsity status within their athletic departments. The ACRA, formed in 2008 by non-varsity and club teams, does not allow varsity teams to participate. As of 2026, there are 32 teams competing in Division I, 5 teams in Division II, and 26 teams in Division III. There are 143 registered men's club teams competing across all levels. While the IRA and ACRA each crown a men's national champion, both regattas are co-ed. The IRA sponsors lightweight women's rowing and the ACRA features both women's open and lightweight races. Men's rowing, like many Olympic Sports, has been impacted by the advent of NIL and the NCAA House Settlement.

Women's rowing initially competed in its intercollegiate championships as part of the National Women's Rowing Association Championship in 1971. From 1980 through 1996, the women's national championships races were conducted at the National Collegiate Rowing Championships in Cincinnati. In the 1996–98 season, many women's club rowing programs were elevated to compete in the newly NCAA sponsored "Championship" sport. Like the IRA, the NCAA requires all participating teams to have varsity status. Several women's club teams, like Vanderbilt and Purdue, compete successfully against varsity-sponsored teams during the regular season and race in the ACRA National Championship each May. Women's collegiate rowing has experienced enormous growth since 1997 which has helped grow the sport at the junior level and the speed of the Olympic level. As of 2026, there are 89 women's teams competing in Division I, 15 in Division II, and 34 in Division III. Many NCAA rosters and budgets have been impacted by the 2025 House Settlement.

== History ==
=== Timeline ===
- 1843 – Yale starts the first collegiate rowing club in the United States.
- 1852 – Yale challenges Harvard to a rowing race and the first Harvard-Yale Boat Race is held. This is also the first intercollegiate event held in the United States. Since 1864 this race has been held annually and since 1878, with few exceptions, it has been raced on the Thames River in New London, Connecticut.
- 1864 – Rowing became the first organized sport at Rutgers. Six-mile races were held on the Raritan River among six-oared boats.
- 1870 – The Rowing Association of American Colleges was established by Bowdoin, Brown and Harvard Universities and Massachusetts Agricultural College, now known as the University of Massachusetts Amherst. The first regatta was held on July 21, 1871, at Ingleside, Massachusetts, on the Connecticut River. This can be considered to be the very first collegiate athletic organization in the country and devised a primary rule of eligibility: that only undergraduate students should be eligible to represent their college in the regatta—a rule which remains in the NCAA to this day.
- 1870 – Rutgers held its first intercollegiate competition on the Raritan River against the Lawrence Scientific School of Harvard, the then top-ranked amateur crew of the time. The distance of the course was three miles.
- 1872 – Princeton's first intercollegiate race, at the National Amateur Regatta, Philadelphia.
- 1875 – Wellesley College established the first women's rowing program.
- 1878 – Columbia wins the Visitors' Challenge Cup and becomes the first foreign crew to win at the Henley Royal Regatta.
- 1891 – The Intercollegiate Rowing Association was founded by Cornell, Columbia, and Pennsylvania: its first annual regatta was hosted on June 24, 1895. Today Navy and Syracuse are also members of the association. Cornell dominates the early regattas winning 14 of the first 23 varsity 8 races.
- 1903 – The University of Washington established a men's and women's rowing program, and beat the University of California in their first dual.

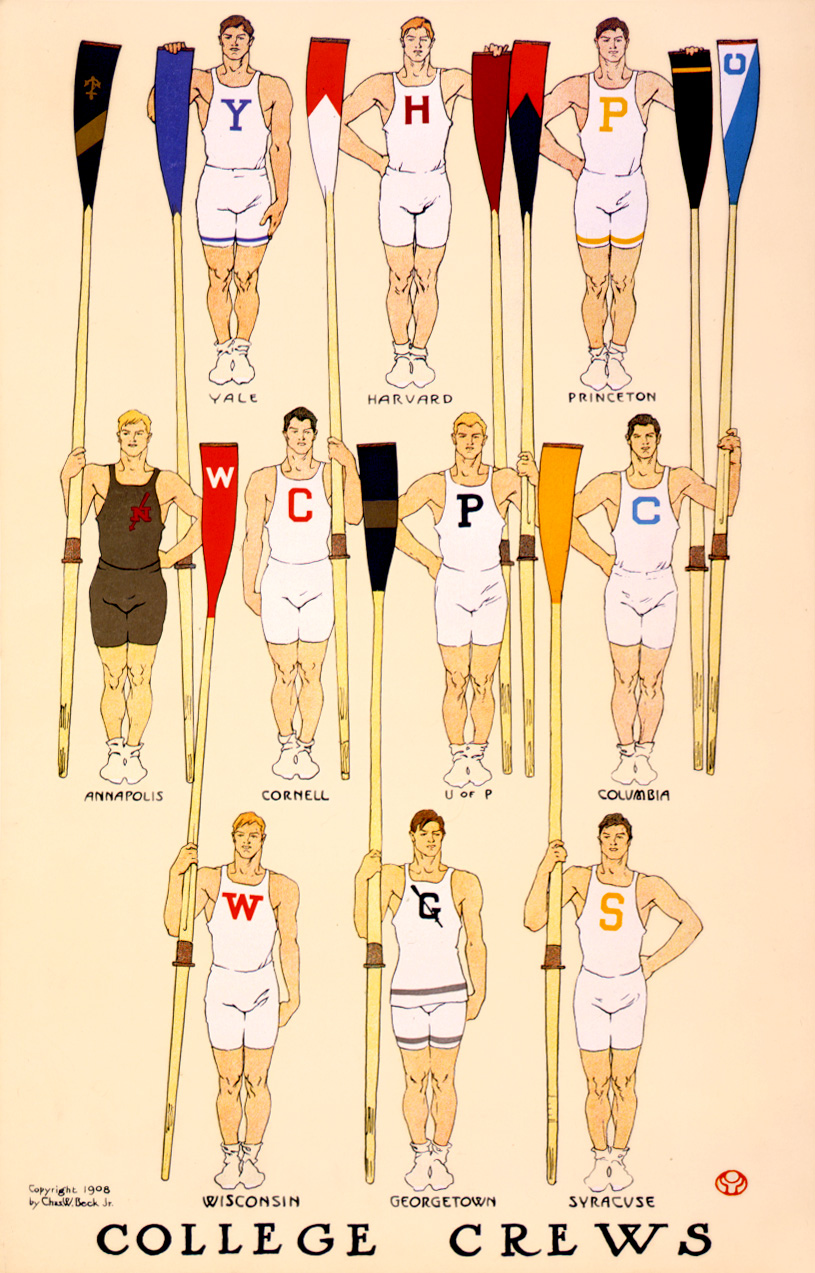
Poster from 1908 depicting rowers from 10 different colleges

- 1908 – Princeton completes the construction of Lake Carnegie, the gift of Andrew Carnegie, as its rowing venue.
- 1916 – Lightweight rowing was first introduced at the University of Pennsylvania.
- 1920 – Navy wins the gold medal at the 1920 Summer Olympics in the eight-man (8+) boat. US collegiate boats would win the gold medal in the 8+ at the next seven Olympics.
- 1922 – The first Harvard-Yale-Princeton lightweight race is held on May 20.
- 1923 – Washington is the first team from the west coast to win the varsity 8 title at the IRA regatta. Between 1920 and 1950, California, Navy and Washington would dominate college rowing winning 21 of the 25 varsity titles at the IRA and five Olympic titles in the eight-man boat.
- 1924 – Yale varsity men's 8 wins Olympic gold in Paris
- 1928 – The University of California varsity men's 8 wins the Olympic gold medal in Amsterdam.
- 1932 – The University of California varsity men's 8 wins its second Olympic gold medal in Los Angeles.
- 1936 – Washington varsity men's 8 wins gold at the 1936 Olympics in Berlin, Germany at the 'Nazi games'. Their story is later recounted in The Boys in the Boat.
- 1946 – The Eastern Association of Rowing Colleges (EARC) is formed and the first Eastern Sprints is held for lightweights and heavyweights.
- 1948 – The University of California varsity men's 8 wins its third Olympic gold at Henley in London.
- 1948 – Princeton becomes the first American lightweight crew to win a championship at Henley (the Thames Cup).
- 1956 – Yale varsity men's 8 wins Olympic gold in Melbourne, Australia.
- 1963 – Harry Parker becomes coach of Harvard.
- 1971 – Collegiate women begin competing in the eight-oared boat (8+) at the National Women's Rowing Association (NWRA) Championship (collegiate and non-collegiate).
- 1972 – Congress passes Title IX, which eventually leads to large growth in women's rowing.
- 1973 – Radcliffe College women's rowing team wins NWRA National Championship.
- 1973 – Princeton women's eight wins New England Intercollegiate Regatta championship (forerunner to EAWRC Women's Eastern Sprints).
- 1975 – The University of Wisconsin women's rowing team wins NWRA National Championship.
- 1976 – The Yale women's rowing team strips in front of the Yale athletic director to demand equal opportunity under Title IX. The incident makes national headlines. The documentary film, A Hero for Daisy, memorializes this event.
- 1976 – First EAWRC Varsity Women's Lightweight 8 championship, won by Boston University,
- 1979 – Yale women's team claims its first national championship as top college finisher at NWRA regatta.
- 1980 – The first Women's National Collegiate Rowing Championship is held at Oak Ridge, Tennessee, sponsored by the National Women's Rowing Association (NWRA).
- 1982 – The only Association for Intercollegiate Athletics for Women (AIAW) rowing championships was held.
- 1986 – The National Women's Rowing Association (NWRA) dissolves and USRowing assumes responsibility as the national governing body for women's rowing.
- 1988 – Northeastern University Men's 8+ capture school's first IRA Championship at Lake Onondaga, NY.
- 1997 – The NCAA establishes a rowing championship for women. Washington sweeps the NCAA Regatta and IRA Regatta.
- 2002 – The University of California Men's 8 wins its fourth straight IRA gold medal (1999, 2000, 2001, 2002), the first four-peat since Cornell (1955–1958).
- 2007 – The American Collegiate Rowing Association is formed after club-level collegiate teams are excluded from the IRAs.
- 2009 – Washington Sweeps the 8+ Events at the IRA Regatta, becoming the first crew to do so since they did in 1997.
- 2010 – The University of California Men's 8 wins gold at the IRAs, its sixth in 12 years and 16th overall, second only to Cornell's 22 titles.
- 2012 – Washington's men win five grand finals at the IRAs, setting record times in 2V8, freshmen 8, V4, and open 4, as well as its 15th V8 IRA title.
- 2023 – The University of California men sweep all five grand finals at the IRAs for the first time in the program's history, winning the overall team points trophy. The V8 wins for the second year in a row for its 19th V8 IRA title.
- 2024 – Washington's men sweep all five grand finals at the IRAs.
- 2025 – Washington's men win the V4, 2V8, and V8 for the second year in a row, with their 21st V8 IRA title. Harvard lightweight men win back-to-back in the LTWT 2V8 and LTWT V8, and the V8 goes on to win the Temple Challenge Cup at the Henley Royal Regatta.

== Categories ==
=== Men's rowing ===
Men's rowing is not affiliated with the National Collegiate Athletic Association. In collegiate men's rowing, the First Varsity 8 is meant to be the fastest boat. Oarsmen not selected for the First Varsity 8 are usually placed in the Second Varsity 8 followed by the Third Varsity. Rowers outside of the top two eights are sometimes, depending on the race, put into fours of various categories. This is the case at the IRA championship, for example, but not at the Eastern Sprints or Pac-10 championship. Freshman separately competed in the Freshman 8, the Second Freshman 8, a Freshman 4, etc., until 2012 when the IRA permitted freshman eligibility to row in a varsity boat. The IRA eliminated freshman races after 2015. The ACRA National Championship still features a 1st Novice 8+, 2nd Novice 8+ and Novice 4+ events. They also elect a Freshmen All-American team each year.

=== Women's rowing ===
NCAA women's rowing is divided into three divisions with an official NCAA championship:

- NCAA Division I Rowing Championship
- NCAA Division II Rowing Championship
- NCAA Division III Rowing Championship

Women rowers compete at the NCAA Division I Rowing Championship in a Varsity 8, a Second Varsity 8, and a Varsity Four. Points are awarded for the overall championship based on the performance of those boats. Other head races and regattas such as Head of the Charles or the Pac-12 Championships allow a wide variety of competition in less-prominent boat classifications such as pair, sculls, and lightweight racing.

There has been spectacular growth in women's rowing over the past 25 years. In 1985, the FISA and Olympic course distance for women was increased from 1,000 meters to 2,000 meters (the same distance raced by men), marking progress in public perception of women's strength, endurance and competitive drive. Universities that have never had a men's team have added women's rowing to the athletic department and are providing funding and athletic scholarships for the expensive and demanding sport, contributing to a noticeable increase in the success and competitiveness of many collegiate women's rowing teams. This, in part, is to comply with Title IX; many of the football powers use women's rowing to help balance out the large number of scholarships awarded to male football players. As a result, many women's college rowers have not previously competed at high school or for a club team.

=== Lightweight rowing ===
When Canadian sculler Joseph Wright began coaching at Penn in 1916, he discovered that he had a number of smaller but excellent oarsmen. His idea of creating a crew composed entirely of these lighter weight rowers—averaging 150 pounds per man—quickly spread to other institutions, and by 1919 the American Rowing Association officially recognized competition in lightweight rowing by 150-pounders in eight-oared shells. The initial weight difference between lightweights and heavyweights of that era—about 20 pounds—was not particularly substantial. In fact, lightweight rowers weights were much closer to the heavyweight crews of that era than they are now. For men, the maximum weight is currently 160 lbs. For women, the weight limit is 130 lbs.

Rowers must propel the weight of their equipment and coxswain as well as their own weight down the race course. The weight of equipment and coxswain is roughly the same for heavyweights and lightweights. As a generalization, the greater the strength, endurance and perseverance of a rower—as compared to the total weight he or she must propel down the course—the greater the speed. In rowing, taller individuals have a leverage advantage, and, as a rule, heavier individuals tend to have more absolute strength to allocate not only to themselves but also to the weight of the equipment and coxswain. A top heavyweight boat will thus be faster than a top lightweight boat, but a top lightweight boat will be faster than many heavyweight boats. For example, the winning lightweight men's 8 at the 2015 to 2019 IRAs was faster than the finals time for all but 6 to 12 heavyweights 8s.

There are races for both men's and women's lightweight rowing. However, many of the smaller colleges have limited sized programs and simply field open weight boats, which include rowers who would qualify as lightweights, and many larger Division I-A universities, cognizant of Title IX issues, have limited the size of their men's programs. This is especially apparent in the west, where California Lightweight Crew remains one of the few programs for men's lightweight rowing in that region.

However, on the east coast, most Ivy League and EARC schools have higher-funded and more well-trained men's lightweight teams. The lightweight men's events at the Eastern Sprints and the Intercollegiate Rowing Association Championship (IRAs) are fiercely contested. For example, the time difference between the first and sixth lightweight men's varsity 8 at the 2019 IRAs was only 1.7 seconds—less than half a length. Since the NCAA Rowing Championships does not have a lightweight event for women, a select number of these teams (e.g., University of Wisconsin) are eligible to compete at IRAs.

Olympic rowing introduced lightweight event categories for the first time at the 1996 Atlanta Games. As of 2024, Olympic rowing has removed lightweight rowing from further Olympic games in exchange for coastal rowing.

=== Freshman/novice rowing ===
Since rowing is such a technical sport, there is a separate category for novices (rowers with less than one year of experience). This is usually combined with freshman rowers, who may have rowed before in high school, but are in their first year in collegiate rowing. The Freshman squad is sometimes open only to college freshmen. However, people who start rowing after their freshman year normally join the novice team as well. The novice squad usually fields a freshman eight-oared boat (8+), and if the team is big enough, a second eight, and/or a four-oared boat (4+). In some collegiate conferences excluding the EARC and Intercollegiate Rowing Association (IRA), collegiate freshmen/novice can also compete as part of the varsity squad. At the 2012 IRA Steward's annual meeting it was voted to repeal the ban on freshmen competing as part of their varsity squad. In the league the term 'First Year Collegiate Rower' will now be used to describe Freshmen/Novice rowing.

== Annual calendar ==
Rowing is one of the few collegiate sports where athletes practice year round and compete during both spring and fall. In addition many athletes train at various rowing clubs around the country during the summer.

=== Fall ===
In the fall, most schools focus on building technical proficiency and improving physical strength and endurance. This is typically accomplished through long steady practice pieces, with occasional shorter interval pieces. In the United States fall is also the season of head races which are typically between three and six kilometers. These longer races are part of the foundation for the spring season, building the rower's endurance and mental toughness. The largest fall race is the Head of the Charles Regatta held in Boston each October. This race includes rowers of all ages, abilities, and affiliations and features the best college crews in competition with Olympic-level athletes from the United States and other countries. The largest collegiate-only regatta in the fall is the Princeton Chase, typically in early November on Lake Carnegie in Princeton, New Jersey, and hosted by Princeton University.

=== Winter ===
This is an intense building period for the spring racing season. The training regimen consists primarily of long interval training, which gradually becomes shorter and more intense as the race season approaches. This is done on the water for schools below the snowline, where warmer climates allow for outdoor workouts. For some of the northern colleges that practice on lakes and rivers that freeze during winter, these pieces are done indoors using ergometers and, if the college is lucky enough to have them, indoor rowing tanks. Additionally, most schools, regardless of whether they have water to row on, do ergometer testing (all out maximum performance tests), weight lifting, and long cardio workouts. A few colleges and universities send their fastest rowers to the CRASH-B Sprints in Boston. This 2,000 meter race is held on ergometers and features separate events for collegiate athletes. Many northeastern colleges have a winter training trip to a warmer state such as Florida, Georgia, North Carolina, Louisiana, South Carolina, Tennessee, or Texas during either winter break or spring break to give students extra time on the water while the local rivers and lakes are frozen.

=== Spring ===
Spring is the primary season for college rowing and the majority of the schedule is composed of duel races. These 2,000-meter races take place between two or, sometimes, three schools. The winner of these races usually receive shirts from the losing teams.

There are also several large regattas, such as the Dad Vail Regatta, Eastern Sprints, Knecht Cup, and the San Diego Crew Classic which may be on the schedule. In this case, the teams compete in either flights, in which the winner is final, or a series of heats and semifinals before the winners move on to the finals. Sprint races begin with all teams lined up and started simultaneously, as opposed to the time trials in the fall.

Performing well in these races is the most important selection criterion for the various post season invitation rowing championships. If the crew is in a league, the duel race and regatta results will also typically be used in determining the team's seeding for the league championship. The Dad Vail Regatta is the second largest collegiate regatta in the world, held on the 2nd weekend in May.

The lightweight division becomes more prominent during the spring. Many head races lack separate categories for heavyweight/lightweight, but spring races usually have a separate weight category for lighter rowers.

== National championships ==
=== Men's ===
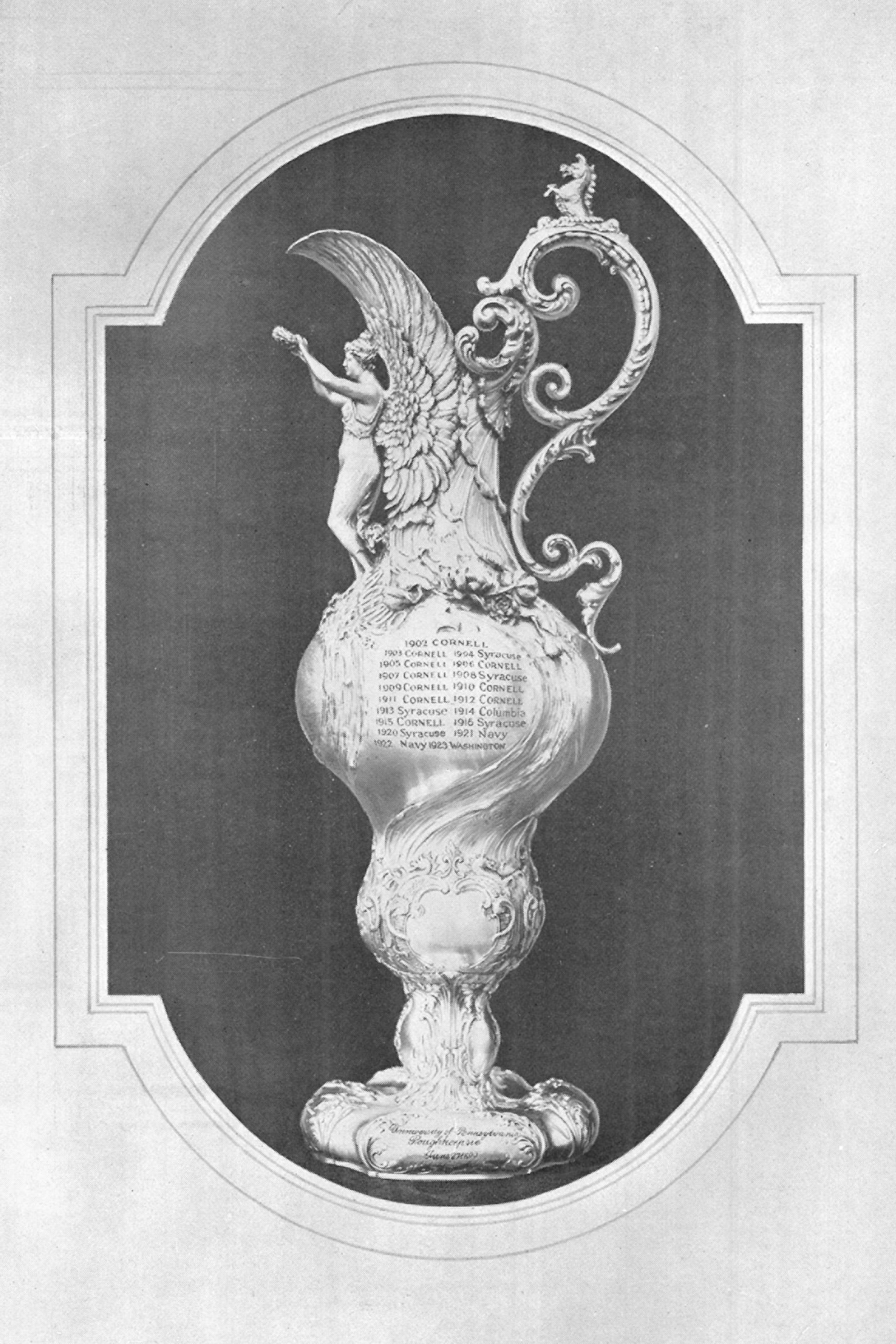
Varsity Challenge Cup for the men's heavyweight eight IRA championship.

The Intercollegiate Rowing Association, known as the IRA, was founded by Cornell, Columbia, and Penn in 1891 and its first annual regatta was hosted on June 24, 1895. Today Navy and Syracuse are also members of the association. Each year these five schools choose whom to invite to the regatta and are responsible for its organization along with the ECAC. The IRA is the oldest college rowing championship in the United States.

The American Collegiate Rowing Association (ACRA) was formed in 2008 by a coalition of club teams, led by Michigan head coach Gregg Hartsuff after the IRA stewards voted to require varsity status among competitors. ACRA has become the worlds largest collegiate regatta. The Michigan Men's Rowing Team won fourteen consecutive ACRA Men's Team Point Trophies from 2008 to 2023. While most varsity teams are barred from competing, JUCO varsity programs like Orange Coast College are eligible and have been successful.

The Dad Vail Regatta in Philadelphia is considered by some teams to be a national championship. The Dad Vail was the largest collegiate regatta in the world for many years and attracted sponsorship from Aberdeen Asset Management, Coca Cola, and Jefferson Health.

==== IRA Qualification ====
Qualification for the IRA National Championship comes from automatic qualifying positions from three major regattas across the United States and at-large bids. The automatic qualification bids are assigned as:

- Eastern Association of Rowing Colleges: Eastern Sprints (Top Seven Eligible IRA Finishers)
- Mountain Pacific Sports Federation: MPSF Championships (Top Five Eligible IRA Finishers)
- Dad Vail Regatta: (Top Four Eligible IRA Finisher)

Typically, there are a total of 24 entries with the above 16 entries granted as automatic qualification bids. The remaining 8 entries are selected by the IRA in the weeks following the conclusion of all qualifying regattas.

The IRA awards the Varsity Challenge Cup to the men's heavyweight national championship 8, the 1922 Trophy to the men's lightweight national championship 8, and the Camden County Freeholders Trophy to the women's lightweight national championship 8. The IRA also awards the Ten Eyck Trophy to the university amassing the largest number of points in three of the four possible eights from each school.

ACRA Qualification

As of 2026, the regatta is open to all willing competitors. Due to a record number of entries for the 2025 Regatta, organizers considered expanding the regatta to a 4th day. The regatta removed lower level finals in order to maintain a 3 day schedule. The John Bancheri Trophy is awarded annually to the overall team points (men and women).

=== Women's ===
Between 1967 and 1980, women's collegiate boats entered the National Women's Rowing Association National Championships (what is now the USRowing National Championships). The college boats raced against club boats, including boats from outside the United States. The best finishing US collegiate boat was deemed to be the National Champion.

The first women's collegiate championship was held in 1980 at Oak Ridge, Tennessee. This race was open solely to collegiate rowing teams.

In 1982, the Association for Intercollegiate Athletics for Women (AIAW) host the championship event.

Since 1997, the NCAA has hosted an invitational rowing championship for women. Unlike the former women's collegiate championship, the NCAA does not have a championship race for women's lightweight rowing. In response, the IRA hosts a women's lightweight event.

The NCAA currently hosts championships for Division I, Division II and Division III colleges, with Divisions II and III having been added in 2002.

NCAA Division I requires colleges to enter two eight-oared shells and one four-oared shell in the team championship. The championship is restricted to 10 conference champions (American, ACC, A-10, Big Ten, Big 12, CAA, Ivy, MAAC, Patriot, and WCC) as automatic qualifiers and 12 at-large schools for a total of 22 teams. The at-large teams are selected by the NCAA Division I Women's Rowing Committee. The NCAA Division II championship consists of an eight-oared shells and four-oared shell competition. The Division III championship involved both varsity and second varsity eights competing in the same event until 2012. Beginning in 2013, the V-1 and V-2 boats compete in separate events.

== NCAA Conferences (women's teams) ==
=== Atlantic Coast Conference ===
The Atlantic Coast Conference (ACC) first held a rowing championship in 2000 with Clemson, Duke, North Carolina, and Virginia participating. The 2005 conference realignment cycle brought two rowing schools into the ACC, with Miami and Boston College respectively joining for the 2005 and 2006 seasons. Further realignment in the early 2010s brought three more rowing schools into the conference. Notre Dame and Syracuse joined the ACC in 2013, with Louisville joining the following year. California, SMU, and Stanford joined in 2024.

ACC Schools
Women (Open Weight)
Boston College
California
Clemson
Duke
Louisville
Miami (FL)
North Carolina
Notre Dame
SMU
Stanford
Syracuse
Virginia

=== Atlantic 10 Conference ===
The Atlantic 10 Conference (A-10) first held a rowing championship in 1996 with 10 schools participating. Today, nine schools participate.

The most recent change to A-10 women's rowing was the 2025 departure of UMass, which became a full member of the Mid-American Conference. That conference started a rowing league in the 2025–26 season.

A-10 Schools
Women (Open Weight)
Dayton
Duquesne
Fordham
George Mason
George Washington
La Salle
Rhode Island
Saint Joseph's

=== Big Ten Conference ===
The Big Ten Conference hosted its first Big Ten Women's Rowing Championship in 2000. Currently seven schools compete in both the Championship Regatta and annual "Double Duals" races consisting of contests between 2–3 Big Ten competitors. The Big Ten is one of the dominant conferences in women's collegiate rowing, with at least one school being selected to compete at the NCAA Rowing Championships every year since its inception.

The Big Ten rowing league expanded to eight members in 2014 when Rutgers joined the conference, and to 11 members in 2024 with the arrival of UCLA, USC, and Washington.

Big Ten Schools
Women (Open Weight)
Indiana
Iowa
Michigan
Michigan State
Minnesota
Ohio State
Rutgers
UCLA
USC
Washington
Wisconsin

=== Big 12 Conference ===
The early history of Big 12 Conference women's rowing is intertwined with the rowing history of Conference USA (CUSA).

The Big 12 contested its first rowing championship in 2008 (2007–08 school year), initially with Kansas, Kansas State, and Texas. Oklahoma joined the following year. In July 2012, West Virginia joined the conference for all sports, bringing the number of rowing schools to five.

In the meantime, CUSA held its first rowing championship in 2010 (2009–10 school year). The Big 12 and CUSA agreed that the four Big 12 schools that then sponsored the sport would also participate in the CUSA championship. These schools were joined by the three full CUSA members that sponsored the sport (SMU, Tulsa, and UCF) and two Southeastern Conference members (Alabama and Tennessee). Alabama did not participate in the 2011 CUSA tournament because of the massive tornado that hit its home city of Tuscaloosa. West Virginia joined the Big 12 in 2012, also joining CUSA women's rowing at that time. Also in 2012, Old Dominion moved five of its sports, including women's rowing, from the CAA to CUSA in advance of that school's 2013 entry into full CUSA membership.

As a result of the 2013 split of the original Big East Conference, SMU and UCF both left CUSA for that league's football-sponsoring offshoot, the American Athletic Conference (now known as the American Conference), in 2013, and Tulsa made the same move a year later. CUSA added two new rowing affiliates for the 2013–14 season in Sacramento State and San Diego State, but both left after that season for The American. The rapid turnover in rowing membership presumably led the Big 12 to take over the CUSA women's rowing league, with the three remaining CUSA rowing schools (Alabama, Old Dominion, Tennessee) becoming Big 12 affiliates.

Old Dominion left Big 12 rowing after the 2017–18 season for the American Athletic Conference.

Amid the early-2020s realignment, initially triggered by the announcement that charter Big 12 members (and rowing schools) Oklahoma and Texas would leave for the Southeastern Conference (SEC) no later than 2025 (later confirmed for 2024), Old Dominion returned to Big 12 rowing in 2024–25, and Tulsa was added as a new affiliate at the same time. The Big 12's announcement of its incoming rowing members hinted at the departure of then-current women's rowing associates and full SEC members Alabama and Tennessee, neither of which was included in the list of Big 12 rowing members for 2024–25. SEC bylaws allow it to hold a championship in any sport sponsored by at least 25% of the full membership. The SEC announced the addition of rowing on August 23, 2024, with Alabama, Oklahoma, Tennessee, and Texas as its inaugural programs.

Big 12 Schools
Women (Open Weight)
Kansas
Kansas State
Old Dominion
Tulsa
UCF
West Virginia

=== Coastal Athletic Association ===
The Coastal Athletic Association (CAA), known before 2023 as the Colonial Athletic Association, began official sponsorship of women's rowing as the conference's 23rd sport in March 2009. Previously, the conference championships were held unofficially as the Kerr Cup, hosted by Drexel University. The first CAA women's rowing championship was conducted on April 18, 2009, in Philadelphia with races in the Varsity 4+, Second Varsity 8+, and Varsity 8+. The event was conducted in conjunction with the Kerr Cup on the Schuylkill River along historic Boathouse Row. The most recent championship in May 2024 was held on the Cooper River in Pennsauken, New Jersey. Four full CAA members currently sponsor women's rowing at the intercollegiate level—the University of Delaware, Drexel University, Monmouth University, and Northeastern University; they are joined by four associate members in Eastern Michigan University, the University of California, San Diego (UC San Diego), the University of Connecticut (UConn), and Villanova University.

Delaware and Eastern Michigan left CAA rowing after the 2024–25 season. Eastern Michigan's full-time home of the Mid-American Conference established its own rowing league in 2025–26, with Delaware (which left the CAA for full membership in Conference USA at that time) becoming an associate member.

UC San Diego will leave in 2027 to join the rowing-sponsoring West Coast Conference. At the same time, Fairfield will join from the Metro Conference.

In the table below, departing schools are indicated in pink and incoming schools in green.

CAA Schools
Women (Open Weight)
Drexel
Fairfield
Monmouth
Northeastern
UC San Diego
UConn
Villanova

=== Ivy League ===
Ivy League women's teams:

Ivy League Schools
Women (Open Weight)
Brown University
Columbia University
Cornell University
Dartmouth College
Harvard University
University of Pennsylvania
Princeton University
Yale University

=== Metro Conference ===
The Metro Conference, known before 2026–27 as the Metro Atlantic Athletic Conference, is a college athletic conference which operates in the northeastern United States. The conference championships are held during the end of April at Cooper River Park in New Jersey.

Fairfield (in pink) will leave the Metro Conference in 2027 for the rowing-sponsoring CAA.

MAAC Schools
Women (Open Weight)
Fairfield
Iona
Manhattan
Marist
Canisius
Drake
Jacksonville
Robert Morris
Sacred Heart
Stetson

=== Mid-American Conference ===
The Mid-American Conference (MAC) started sponsoring rowing in 2025–26.

MAC Schools
Women (Open Weight)
Delaware
Eastern Michigan
High Point
Temple
Toledo
UMass

=== Pac-12 Conference ===
The Pac-12 Conference shut down its women's rowing league upon its 2024 collapse, which saw 10 of its previous 12 members, six of which sponsored women's rowing, leave for other conferences. The rowing league was reestablished in 2026–27 despite only three members—legacy members Oregon State and Washington State, plus 2026 arrival Gonzaga—sponsoring the sport.

Pac-12 Schools
Women (Open Weight)
Gonzaga
Oregon State
Washington State

=== Patriot League ===
Patriot League Schools
Women (Open Weight)
Boston University
Bucknell
Colgate
Holy Cross
Lehigh
Loyola (MD)
MIT
Navy

=== Southeastern Conference ===
The Southeastern Conference (SEC) began sponsoring rowing in 2024–25.

SEC Schools
Women (Open Weight)
Alabama
Oklahoma
Tennessee
Texas

=== West Coast Conference ===
The West Coast Conference (WCC) first held a women's rowing championship in 1997 with five of the league's eight members at that time participating—Gonzaga, Loyola Marymount, Saint Mary's, San Diego, and Santa Clara. Creighton became a WCC associate member starting with the 2011 championship, and longtime WCC member Portland added a varsity rowing team the following season. With the 2024 collapse of the Pac-12 Conference, that conference's last two members, Oregon State and Washington State, placed most of their sports (including rowing) in the WCC through 2025–26, after which the Pac-12 added seven new members—one being longtime full WCC member Gonzaga. The Pac-12 reinstated women's rowing despite only those three schools sponsoring the sport.

WCC Schools
Women (Open Weight)
Creighton
Portland
Sacramento State
Saint Mary's
San Diego
Santa Clara
Seattle

=== Eastern College Athletic Conference/Metro League ===
The ECAC/Metro League is a women's rowing conference.

The participating schools are: Buffalo, Colgate, Delaware, Fordham, Mercyhurst, New Hampshire, Rhode Island, UMass Villanova, and West Virginia. Most of these schools have dual conference memberships in rowing.

== Other conferences ==
=== Eastern Association of Rowing Colleges ===
The Eastern Association of Rowing Colleges (EARC) was formed in 1946. It is a men's rowing conference composed of the Ivy League schools plus other select universities. Each year the EARC schools race at the Eastern Sprints regatta on Lake Quinsigamond in Massachusetts, which, for the men, is generally considered the most important race of the year aside from the IRA.

The EARC men's lightweight team which attains the highest points for the Freshman 8+, Second Varsity 8+ (JV), and First Varsity 8+ are awarded the Jope Cup.

On the women's side, the conference is called the Eastern Association of Women's Rowing Colleges (EAWRC). The Women's Eastern Sprints, held on the Cooper River in Camden, New Jersey, are highly competitive, on a similar level of competitiveness as the Aramark Central Region Championships and Pac-12 Championships.

The Eastern Sprints also serve as the Ivy League Championship, with the best-placed boat from an Ivy League school being crowned Ivy League Champion.

EARC/EAWRC Schools
Lightweight Men	Heavyweight Men	Openweight Women	Lightweight Women
–	–	Boston College	–
–	Boston University	Boston University	Boston University
–	Brown	Brown	–
Columbia	Columbia	Columbia	–
Cornell	Cornell	Cornell	–
Dartmouth	Dartmouth	Dartmouth	–
Georgetown	Georgetown	Georgetown	Georgetown
–	–	George Washington	–
Harvard	Harvard	Radcliffe	Radcliffe
–	Holy Cross	–	–
–	–	MIT	MIT
Navy	Navy	Navy	–
–	Northeastern	Northeastern	–
Penn	Penn	Penn	–
Princeton	Princeton	Princeton	Princeton
–	Rutgers	Rutgers	–
–	Syracuse	Syracuse	–
–	Wisconsin	–	Wisconsin
Yale	Yale	Yale	–

=== Division II Independent ===
All three teams play in their respective Division II conferences, yet have not formed a larger northeast conference sponsoring rowing, hence, these three schools all play in the East Region. Notably, Mercyhurst is a former DII Independent School, and the only DII independent school to have won the DII Rowing Championship (doing so twice). However, the school has transitioned to Division I, leaving only three teams to play within the independent "division".

Institution	Location	Nickname	Primary conference
Assumption University	Worcester, Massachusetts	Greyhounds	Northeast-10
Franklin Pierce University	Rindge, New Hampshire	Ravens	Northeast-10
Thomas Jefferson University (Jefferson)	Philadelphia, Pennsylvania	Rams	CACC

=== Mid-Atlantic Rowing Conference ===
Prior to the formation of the Mid-Atlantic Rowing Conference, the nine charter member schools—Bryn Mawr College, Franklin & Marshall College, Johns Hopkins University, Marietta College, the University of Mary Washington, North Park University, Richard Stockton College, Rutgers University–Camden, and Washington College—enjoyed an affiliation due to their annual competition at the Mid-Atlantic Division III Rowing Championships, formerly the Atlantic Collegiate League Sprints Championships. In late 2008, the rowing programs at the nine schools expressed a common desire to formalize their association in order to enhance the student-athlete experience for their rowers. From that desire, the Mid-Atlantic Rowing Conference was born in January 2009 and the Mid-Atlantic Division III Rowing Championships became the Mid-Atlantic Rowing Conference Championships.

Mid-Atlantic Rowing Conference Schools
Men	Women
Adrian Bulldogs	Adrian Bulldogs
Catholic University Cardinals	Catholic University Cardinals
Franklin & Marshall Diplomats	Franklin & Marshall Diplomats
St. Mary's Seahawks	St. Mary's Seahawks
Stockton Ospreys	Stockton Ospreys
Washington College Shoremen	Washington College Shorewomen
–	Bryn Mawr Owls
–	Cabrini Cavaliers
–	Johnson & Wales Wildcats
–	North Park Vikings
–	Ohio Wesleyan Battling Bishops

=== Mountain Pacific Sports Federation ===
The Mountain Pacific Sports Federation (MPSF), a multi-sports conference created to provide competitive opportunities in non-revenue sports, began sponsoring men's rowing in 2024–25 with eight NCAA Division I members.

Institution	Location	Nickname	Primary conference
University of California, Berkeley (California)	Berkeley, California	Golden Bears	ACC
Gonzaga University	Spokane, Washington	Bulldogs	Pac-12
Oregon State University	Corvallis, Oregon	Beavers	Pac-12
University of San Diego	San Diego, California	Toreros	WCC
Santa Clara University	Santa Clara, California	Broncos	WCC
Stanford University	Stanford, California	Cardinal	ACC
University of California, San Diego (UC San Diego)	La Jolla, California	Tritons	Big West (WCC in 2027)
University of Washington	Seattle, Washington	Huskies	Big Ten

=== New England Small College Athletic Conference ===
The New England Small Collegiate Athletic Conference (NESCAC) is an American collegiate athletic conference comprising sports teams from eleven highly selective liberal arts institutions of higher education in the Northeastern United States. The NESCAC Division III Rowing Teams use the National Invitational Rowing Championships as their conference championship.

NESCAC Rowing Schools
Men	Women
Amherst College	Amherst College
Bates College	Bates College
Bowdoin College	Bowdoin College
Colby College	Bowdoin College
Connecticut College	Connecticut College
Hamilton College	Hamilton College
Middlebury College	Middlebury College
Tufts University	Tufts University
Trinity College	Trinity College
Wesleyan University	Wesleyan University
Williams College	Williams College

=== Great Northwest Athletic Conference ===
The Great Northwest Athletic Conference consists of four schools. Though only having two primary members (Seattle Pacific and Western Washington), they have welcomed both Cal Poly Humboldt and the University of Central Oklahoma as affiliate members. The championship is typically held two weeks prior to the DII Rowing Championship. This division is considered a power conference within Division II rowing as the division has been responsible for 15 of the 22 awarded national champions (though many championships occurred during membership in the NCRC). Notably, Seattle Pacific is the only school currently in the conference to have not won the DII rowing championship, their best finish being runner-up in 2010 to rival Western Washington.

School	Location
Cal Poly Humboldt	Arcata, California
Central Oklahoma	Edmond, Oklahoma
Seattle Pacific	Seattle, Washington
Western Washington	Bellingham, Washington

=== Sunshine State Conference ===
The Sunshine State Conference consists of six NCAA Division II member schools in USRowing's Southeast region. The Conference hosts two major regattas each year. The SSC double duals takes place during late-March with the venue rotating between member schools hosting, and has welcomed non-conference members from the south. Conference championships are annually held the third weekend of April at the Nathan Benderson Park on Nathan Benderson Park, Florida. Notably, Florida Tech cut both men and women's rowing without warning to the athletes. However, the men's team was subsequently reinstated following a court case won by the male students, claiming less sports were available to them despite there being a higher male population on campus, violating Title IX. The conference has had a team win the national championship three times.

SSC Schools
Men	Women
	Barry University
Embry Riddle Aeronautical University	Embry Riddle Aeronautical University
Florida Institute of Technology	
	Nova Southeastern University
Rollins College	Rollins College
University of Tampa	University of Tampa

=== Western Intercollegiate Rowing Association ===
The Western Intercollegiate Rowing Association (WIRA) is an American collegiate conference that sponsors men's and women's rowing.

== Olympic medals won by U.S. collegiate boats ==
Up until the 1968 Summer Olympics, the United States had a trial system to pick the boats that would represent the United States in the Olympics. The top boats in the country, both collegiate and club, would participate in the Olympic Trials after the end of the collegiate calendar.

With the exception of 1964, a college boat won every Olympics Trials in the eight-oared boat (8+) from 1920 through 1968—and all of the boats from 1920 through 1956 won gold medals. College boats also have had some success in the four-man events (4+) and (4-) and the pair (2-).

Beginning in 1972, the United States has chosen its eight from a national selection camp. Numerous college athletes have made Olympic boats, but they were not specifically representing their University either at the camp, or at the Olympic trials for some of the smaller boats.

Below is a list of college boats that represented the United States at the Olympics:

=== Eight (8+) ===
==== Olympic gold medals ====
- 1920 Summer Olympics Brussels—United States Naval Academy
- 1924 Summer Olympics Paris—Yale University
- 1928 Summer Olympics Amsterdam—University of California
- 1932 Summer Olympics Los Angeles—University of California
- 1936 Summer Olympics Berlin—University of Washington
- 1948 Summer Olympics London—University of California
- 1952 Summer Olympics Helsinki—United States Naval Academy
- 1956 Summer Olympics Melbourne—Yale University

==== Other Olympic eight-man boats ====
- 1960 Summer Olympics Rome—United States Naval Academy (5th Place)
- 1968 Summer Olympics Mexico City—Harvard University (6th Place)

==== Coxed fours (4+) ====
- 1928 Summer Olympics Amsterdam—Harvard University (eliminated)
- 1948 Summer Olympics London, Gold Medal – University of Washington
- 1952 Summer Olympics Helsinki, Bronze Medal – University of Washington
- 1964 Summer Olympics Tokyo—Harvard University (eliminated)
- 1968 Summer Olympics Mexico City—University of Pennsylvania (5th Place)

==== Coxless fours (4-) ====
- 1948 Summer Olympics London, Bronze Medal – Yale University
- 1952 Summer Olympics Helsinki, United States Naval Academy (eliminated)

==== Coxless pairs (2-) ====
- 1948 Summer Olympics London – Yale University (eliminated)
- 1952 Summer Olympics Helsinki, Gold Medal – Rutgers University

== See also ==
- University rowing in the United Kingdom
