= Boston University Terriers =

Collegiate athletic teams representing Boston University

- University: Boston University
- Nickname: Terriers
- NCAA: Division I
- Conference: Patriot League (primary); Hockey East (ice hockey); EARC (rowing)
- Athletic director: Drew Marrochello
- Location: Boston, Massachusetts
- Varsity teams: 24 (10 men, 14 women)
- Football stadium: Nickerson Field (1953–97)
- Basketball arena: Case Gym
- Ice hockey arena: Agganis Arena
- Softball stadium: BU Softball Field
- Colors: Scarlet and white
- Mascot: Rhett the Boston Terrier
- Fight song: Go BU
- Website: goterriers.com
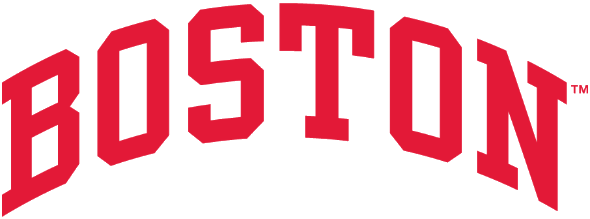

The Boston University Terriers are the ten men's and fourteen women's varsity athletic teams representing Boston University in NCAA Division I competition. Boston University's team nickname is the Terriers, and the official mascot is Rhett the Boston Terrier. The school colors are Scarlet and White.

The majority of Boston University's teams compete as members of the Patriot League, with the ice hockey teams competing in Hockey East and rowing competing in the EARC.

== Conference change ==
On July 1, 2013, Boston University left the America East Conference and joined the Patriot League.

== Sports sponsored ==
Men's sports	Women's sports
Basketball	Basketball
Cross country	Cross country
Ice hockey	Field hockey
Lacrosse	Golf
Rowing	Ice hockey
Soccer	Lacrosse
Swimming	Lightweight rowing
Tennis	Rowing
Track and field^{1}	Soccer
	Softball
	Swimming
	Tennis
	Track and field^{1}
^{1} – includes both indoor and outdoor.

Boston University is one of 4 NCAA Division I schools to not sponsor at least one of women's volleyball or baseball (The other 3 being Detroit Mercy, Drexel, and Vermont).

=== Ice hockey ===
Boston University's ice hockey team is the most successful sports program at the school, with five national championships (1971, 1972, 1978, 1995, 2009) and 21 appearances in the Frozen Four. The Terriers have also been the national runners-up five times, and have won five ECAC tournament championships and seven Hockey East tournament championships. Many of Boston University's hockey players have gone on to successful careers in the NHL.

Since 1984 the Terriers have played in the Hockey East conference, along with crosstown arch-rivals Boston College (BC). The series with Boston College is known as the Green Line Rivalry or the Battle of Commonwealth Avenue. Under long-time coach and former player, Jack Parker, Boston University excelled in the 1990s, winning six Hockey East regular season titles, four Hockey East tournament titles, the 1995 National Championship and three National runner-up trophies. Boston University missed the Frozen Four for 11 consecutive seasons beginning in 1998 but returned to glory by winning the national championship in 2009.

Boston University has dominated the annual Beanpot tournament, which has been contested by the four Boston metro area-based collegiate teams – the others being BC, Northeastern and Harvard – since the 1952–53 season. The televised tourney is a local institution, played in front of annual sellouts at the TD Garden, and is a fierce battle for bragging rights. As of 2010, the Terriers have won 29 of 58 Beanpots and 12 of the last 16.

=== Other varsity sports ===
For most other sports, Boston University competes in the Patriot League. The men's basketball team earned post-season berths in the NCAA tournament or NIT four straight seasons between 2002 and 2005 and also in 2011. They are known to have a rivalry with the Albany Great Danes and the Vermont Catamounts. The program is notable for grooming big name college coaches such as Rick Pitino, Mike Jarvis, and Patrick Chambers.

The Terriers also have a history of national success in men's and women's soccer, women's tennis, field hockey, and women's lacrosse. The men's and women's rowing teams compete in the EARC and EAWRC respectively, the oldest and most competitive conference in collegiate rowing. The women's tennis team has won the most conference titles of any varsity sport at Boston University, holding 28 conference titles across the America East and Patriot League Conferences. In 1991 and 1992 the women's rowing team won back-to-back national championships. From 1884 to 1997, the Terriers also had an American football team.

== Championships ==
=== National team championships ===
- Men's (5)
  - Ice Hockey (5): 1971, 1972, 1978, 1995, 2009
- Women's (2)
  - Rowing- Varsity Eight (2): 1991, 1992

=== Conference championships ===
Men's conference championships

- Hockey (17): 1965, 1967, 1971, 1976, 1978, 1979, 1994, 1995, 1996, 1997, 1998, 2000, 2006, 2009, 2015, 2017, 2023 - Tournament (15): 1972, 1974, 1975, 1976, 1977, 1986, 1991, 1994, 1995, 1997, 2006, 2009, 2015, 2018, 2023
- Basketball (8): 1980, 1983, 1990, 1997, 1998, 2003, 2004, 2014 - Tournament (7): 1983, 1988, 1990, 1997, 2002, 2011, 2020
- Football (5): 1980, 1982, 1983, 1984, 1993
- Lacrosse (1): 2022 - Tournament (1): 2022
- Soccer (13): 1988, 1990, 1991, 1992, 1993, 1994, 2001, 2004, 2008, 2010, 2011, 2014, 2023 - Tournament (8): 1993, 1994, 1995, 1996, 1997, 2004, 2008, 2023
- Tennis (4): 1988, 1993, 1994, 1996
- Swimming & Diving (3): 1993, 2002, 2013
- Cross Country (11): 1989, 1990, 1991, 1992, 1993, 1994, 1995, 1996, 1997, 2000, 2010
- Golf (1): 2022

Women's conference championships

- Hockey (2): 2011, 2013 - Tournament (6): 2010, 2012, 2013, 2014, 2015, 2025
- Basketball (3): 1988, 2009, 2012 - Tournament (3): 1988, 1989, 2003
- Soccer (12): 2000, 2001, 2003, 2005, 2007, 2008, 2009, 2010, 2011, 2012 - Tournament (9): 2000, 2001, 2003, 2005, 2007, 2008, 2009, 2010, 2011
- Tennis (28): 1989, 1990, 1991, 1992, 1993, 1995, 1996, 1997, 1998, 1999, 2000, 2001, 2002, 2003, 2004, 2005, 2006, 2007, 2008, 2009, 2010, 2011, 2014, 2015, 2016, 2017, 2021, 2023 - Tournament (19): 1999, 2000, 2001, 2002, 2003, 2004, 2005, 2006, 2007, 2008, 2009, 2010, 2011, 2014, 2015, 2016, 2017, 2021, 2023
- Lacrosse (6): 2000, 2003, 2005, 2008, 2009, 2012 - Tournament (9): 2000, 2002, 2003, 2005, 2006, 2007, 2008, 2009, 2010
- Field Hockey (12): 2000, 2002, 2003, 2005, 2006, 2007, 2008, 2009, 2010 - Tournament (8): 1991, 1993, 1999, 2000, 2005, 2006, 2007, 2009
- Softball (8): 1993, 2001, 2002, 2003, 2007, 2010, 2011, 2012 - Tournament (9): 1992, 1993, 1996, 1997, 2002, 2003, 2009, 2010, 2012, 2014
- Swimming & Diving (5): 1990, 1994, 2009, 2010, 2012
- Indoor Track & Field (13): 1990, 1991, 1992, 1997, 1999, 2000, 2002, 2006, 2007, 2008, 2009, 2012, 2014
- Outdoor Track & Field (3): 1993, 2008, 2014
- Cross Country (13): 1990, 1992, 1993, 1994, 1996, 1997, 1998, 1999, 2000, 2001, 2002, 2004, 2005, 2006, 2013, 2014
- Golf (13): 1990, 1992, 1993, 1994, 1996, 1997, 1998, 1999, 2000, 2001, 2002, 2004, 2005, 2006, 2013, 2014

== Facilities ==
In 2005, Boston University opened Agganis Arena for hockey and basketball, named after alumnus and Boston Red Sox first baseman Harry Agganis. The facility was designed as a hockey arena: a departure from Boston University's Walter Brown Arena which had the smallest playing ice in Division I. Depending on its configuration, Agganis Arena can seat up to 8,000 people, so it is sometimes utilized for events that would be too small for the 18,624-seat TD Garden.

Other facilities include the indoor Track and Tennis Center and the Fitness and Recreation Center ("FitRec"), which includes a pool and diving well for the swim teams. The 200-meter indoor track is modeled on the previous high-banked Armory track, which attracted programs looking to run fast times. The turns, banked up to 18.5 degrees help runners push through turns at normal speed and rhythm, and can produce many personal indoor bests. The Track and Tennis Center hosts the annual BU Invitational. At the 2018 BU Valentine Invitational, Edward Cheserek ran a 3:49.44 mile to become the second-fastest indoor mile runner of all time.

Soccer and lacrosse are played on the artificial surface of Nickerson Field. Field hockey competes at New Balance Field.

== Mascot ==
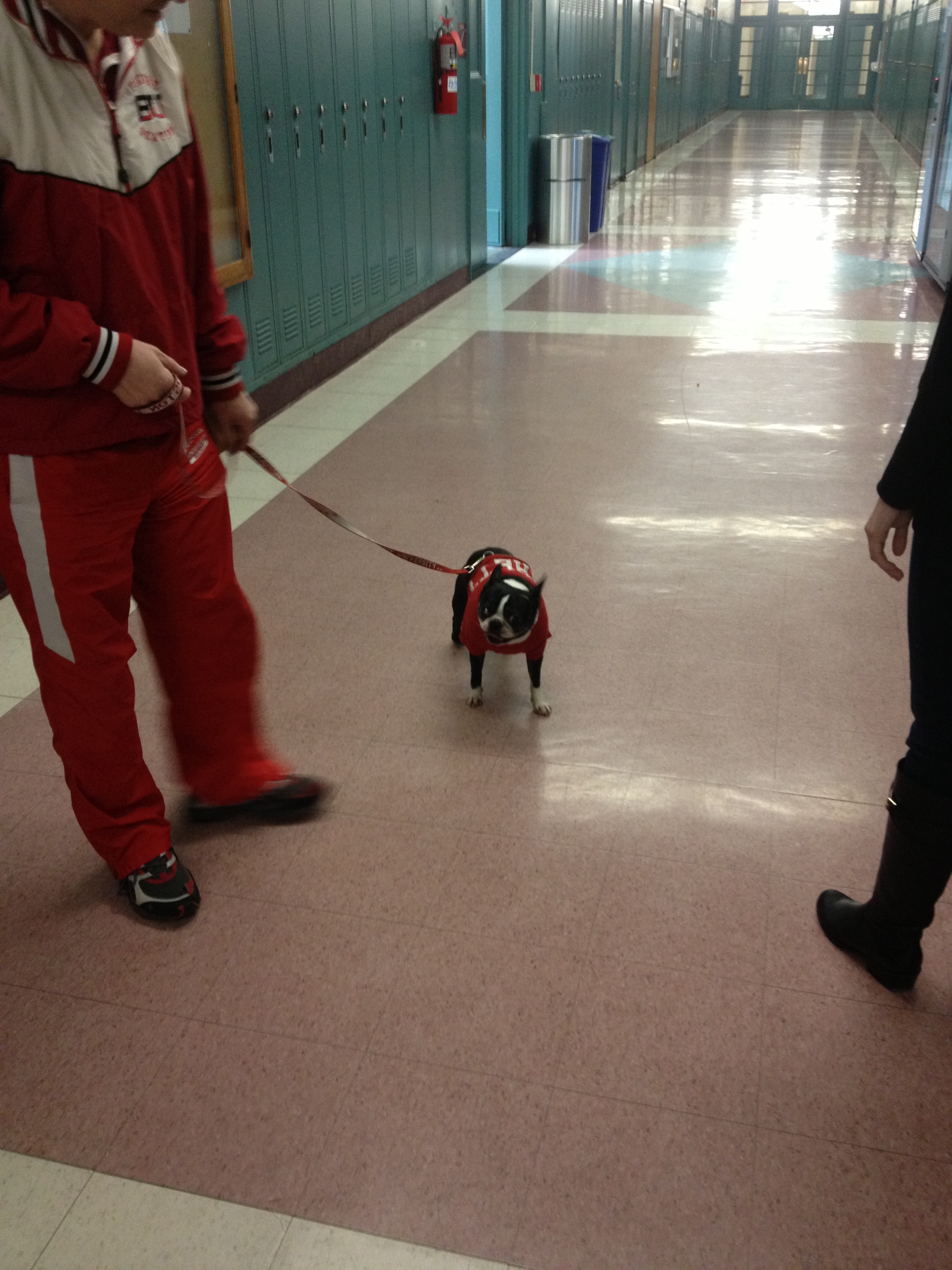
Rhett, an early incarnation of the unofficial mascot, being walked around inside the College of Arts and Sciences

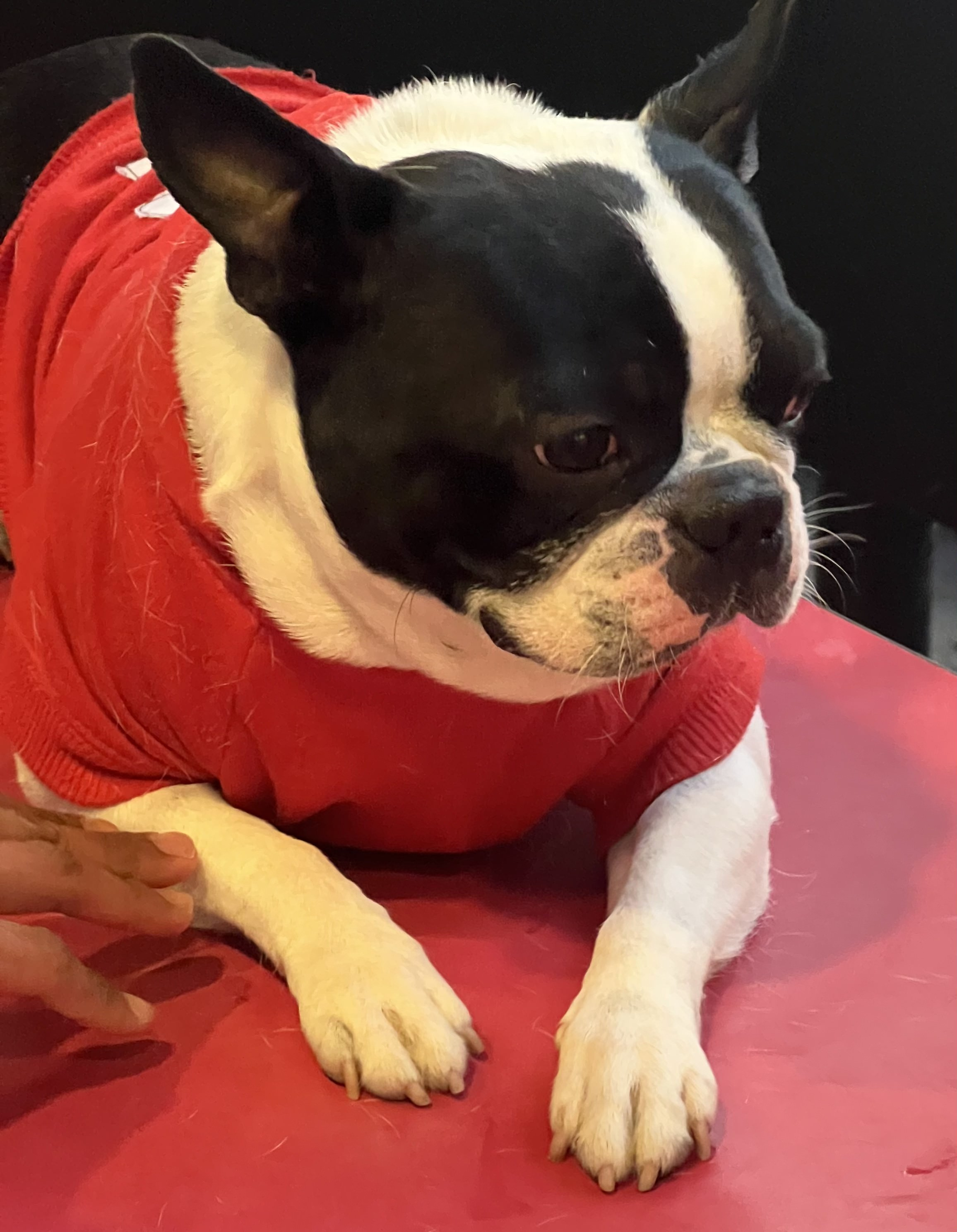
Rhett II "Artoo", a current incarnation of Rhett the Boston Terrier

Rhett the Boston Terrier is the official costumed mascot of Boston University and the Boston University Academy. In November 1922, the Boston Terrier dog breed was chosen as the university's mascot in a student vote, winning over the alternatives of a bull (male) moose or elephant. Aside from the breed's longtime association with the city of Boston, the breed was first bred in the United States in 1869, the year of Boston University's chartering.

In October 1925, the Boston University football team adopted a terrier pup named Pep to serve as its mascot, though it was referred to as "Kappa" by BU News, the university's newspaper, in an October 1927 issue. In 1933, Boston University students purchased another terrier named Danny to become the new mascot. Following Danny's death from drowning in the Charles River, another terrier named Danny II was purchased in November 1935. After Danny II ran away, a terrier pup was donated to Boston University Dean Atlee L. Percy in October 1949 and named Gulliver in a student vote. In 1956, Boston University acquired its next Boston Terrier mascot dog, which was initially named Fumbles before being renamed to Touchdown.

In 1969, the current mascot dog, Terrier III, died without a replacement being purchased until 1980. When Boston University unveiled a costumed mascot at a home football game in November 1983, it was named Rhett, referencing Rhett Butler's affection for Scarlett O'Hara in Margaret Mitchell's Gone with the Wind since Boston University's primary color is scarlet. The mascot costume has been changed in 1996, 2004, and 2008.

In 2008, alumnus Calvin Iwanicki named his Boston Terrier pet dog Rhett, often showcasing him across campus buildings as the university's unofficial mascot. After Rhett's death in March 2020, Iwanicki purchased another Boston Terrier pup in August 2020, which he named Rhett the Second and nicknamed as Artoo.

Rhett's nemesis is Baldwin, the Boston College eagle. Rhett has participated in several ESPN "This is SportsCenter" commercials and competed three times in the Universal Cheerleading Association's mascot nationals, placing as high as fourth in 2002. He was also named an All-American in 1996 and "Boston's Top Mascot" in 1998.

During the 2020 George Floyd protests, Boston University President Robert A. Brown appointed a committee to consider renaming the mascot based on complaints that Rhett Butler's character associated with the Confederate States of America and sexual assault.
