= Mary I. O'Connor =

American rower and orthopedic surgeon

- Born: c. 1959 (age 66–67); New Castle, Pennsylvania, U.S.
- Education: Yale University; Medical College of Pennsylvania
- Occupations: orthopedic surgeon professor of orthopedics
- Known for: 1980 U.S. Olympic Team; Yale National Championship women's rowing
- Medical career
- Field: orthopedic surgery
- Institutions: Yale School of Medicine; Mayo Clinic
- Sub-specialties: knee and hip replacements bone and soft tissue tumors
- Research: knee osteoarthritis knee replacement surgery limb salvage surgery health care process improvement
- Awards: Congressional Gold Medal; Corinne Farrell Award, International Skeletal Society

Mary I. O’Connor (born circa 1959) was a 1980 U.S. Olympic team rower and an orthopedic surgeon, researcher, and professor with the Mayo Clinic and Yale School of Medicine. She was also a member of the 1976 Yale women's rowing team that protested inequalities, starting the Title IX movement to fight sexual discrimination in college athletics.

== Early life ==
O’Connor was born and raised in New Castle, Pennsylvania. She attended Yale University where she was a member of St. Anthony Hall and the women's rowing team. She graduated from Yale in 1979 with a degree in biochemistry. She then attended the Medical College of Pennsylvania (now Drexel University College of Medicine).

== Rowing ==
O'Connor did not participate in sports in high school because there were no teams for girls. In college, she began rowing—a sport that had just started for women at Yale in 1972. This was early in the history of women at Yale, and female athletes were being treated more like an intramural team than a varsity sport.

In 1976, the nineteen members of the Yale women's crew wrote "TITLE IX" on their bodies and went into athletic director Joni Barnett's office and took off their clothes, and then rower Chris Ernst read a statement about the way they were being treated. This protest was noted by newspapers around the world, including The New York Times. By 1977, a women's locker room was added to Yale's boathouse. (Previously, after practice the men showered, but there was no bathroom available for the women's crew team. Women had to wait on the bus before they could return to campus.) This protest was chronicled in the 1999 documentary A Hero For Daisy.

The Yale's women's rowing team went on to win the Eastern Sprints in 1977 and 1979, and the National Championship in 1979.

Aspiring for the Olympics, O'Connor went to the U.S.A. team selections in 1978 but did not make the cut. However, in 1979 she was a member of Yale's varsity National Championship team. In 1979, she returned to the U.S.A. team selections and made the women's eight team and began competing and training for the 1980 Olympics. In the pre-Olympic races in Europe, this team set the world's record and won a Bronze medal. However, O'Connor did not get to participate in the 1980 Summer Olympics because the United States boycotted the games that year. O'Connor says, "We felt used and that we were just political pawns."

== Career ==
O'Connor became a resident in orthopedic surgery at the Mayo Clinic College of Medicine and Science in Rochester, Minnesota in 1985. She also was a fellow in orthopedic oncology at the Mayo Clinic in Rochester. She then became a professor of orthopedics and rehabilitation at the Yale School of Medicine.

In 1991, O'Connor became a professor of orthopedics at the Mayo Clinic in Florida, becoming the chair of the department of orthopedic surgery in 2005. There, she operated on bone and soft tissue tumors, and also performed knee and hip replacements. Her focus areas were knee osteoarthritis, knee replacement surgery, limb salvage surgery, and health care process improvement. She also researched the differences between how women and men feel knee arthritis and the impact of stem cell injections on knee arthritis. Her research has been published in Clinical Orthopaedics and Related Research, the Journal of Arthroplasty, and The Journal of Bone and Joint Surgery.

From 2006 to 2010, she was a member of the Advisory Committee on Research on Women's Health for the National Institutes of Health. She is a former president of the American Association of Hip and Knee Surgeons, the Association of Bone and Joint Surgeons, the International Society of Limb Salvage, the Ruth Jackson Orthopaedic Society, and the Musculoskeletal Tumor Society of which she was also the first female member. In 2010, she became co-chair and later chair of the Movement is Life Caucus, a coalition that works on the musculoskeletal health disparities among women and minorities.

In 2015, O'Connor became the first director of the Center for Musculoskeletal Care at the Yale School of Medicine and Yale New Haven Health System. In February 2021, she co-founded and became the chief medical officer of Vori Health, a musculoskeletal medical startup. She is also a professor emerita of orthopedic surgery with the Mayo Clinic.

== Awards and honors ==
- Congressional Gold Medal as a 1980 Olympian
- Distinguished Clinician at Mayo Clinic
- The Corinne Farrell Award from the International Skeletal Society in 2009
- Health Care Hero by the Jacksonville Business Journal in 2011
- Woman of Distinction by the Girl Scouts of Gateway Council in 2015

== Select publications ==
- O'Connor, Mary I. Limited Incisions for Total Hip Arthroplasty (Monograph Series). American Academy of Orthopaedic Surgeons, 2007. ISBN 978-0892034246
- Instructional Course. Azar, Frederick M. Azar and O'Connor, Mary I., editors. Instructional Course Lectures American Academy of Orthopaedic Surgeons, vol 58, 2009. ISBN 978-0892035915
- O'Connor, Mary I. and Haq, Kanwal L. Taking Care of You: The Empowered Woman’s Guide to Better Health. Mayo Clinic Press, 2022. ISBN 978-1945564147

== Personal life ==
O'Connor is married and has two daughters and a son who all row.
