= Women's Eastern Sprints =

American annual rowing championship

Women's Eastern Sprints refers to the annual rowing championship for the Eastern Association of Women's Rowing Colleges (EAWRC) league. The teams include all of the Ivy League schools as well as others such as MIT, BU, and Wisconsin.

The race is held on Lake Waramaug in New Preston, Connecticut.

== EAWRC Varsity Openweight 8 Winners ==
| Year | Winner |
|---|---|
| 1974 | Radcliffe |
| 1975 | Radcliffe |
| 1976 | Wisconsin |
| 1977 | Yale |
| 1978 | Finals Cancelled |
| 1979 | Yale |
| 1980 | Penn |
| 1981 | Yale |
| 1982 | Princeton |
| 1983 | BU |
| 1984 | Wisconsin |
| 1985 | Princeton |
| 1986 | Wisconsin |
| 1987 | Radcliffe |
| 1988 | Brown |
| 1989 | Radcliffe |
| 1990 | Princeton |
| 1991 | BU |
| 1992 | BU |
| 1993 | Princeton |
| 1994 | Princeton |
| 1995 | Princeton |
| 1996 | Brown |
| 1997 | Princeton |
| 1998 | Brown |
| 1999 | Brown |
| 2000 | Brown |
| 2001 | Princeton |
| 2002 | Brown |
| 2003 | Radcliffe |
| 2004 | Princeton |
| 2005 | Yale |
| 2006 | Princeton |
| 2007 | Yale |
| 2008 | Brown |
| 2009 | Yale |
| 2010 | Yale |
| 2011 | Princeton |
| 2012 | Virginia |

== EAWRC Varsity Lightweight 8 Winners ==
- 2015 - Radcliffe
- 2014- Radcliffe
- 2013 - Radcliffe
- 2012 - Wisconsin
- 2011 - Princeton
- 2010 - Wisconsin
- 2009 - Wisconsin
- 2008 - Wisconsin
- 2007- Wisconsin
- 2006- Wisconsin
- 2005- Wisconsin
- 2004- Radcliffe
- 2003- Princeton
- 2002- Princeton
- 2001- Wisconsin
- 2000- Princeton
- 1999- Princeton
- 1998- Princeton
- 1997- Radcliffe
- 1996- Radcliffe
- 1994- Radcliffe
- 1993- Radcliffe
- 1990- Radcliffe
- 1989- Rochester
- 1987- Radcliffe
- 1985- Radcliffe
- 1984- Radcliffe
- 1983- Smith
- 1981- MIT
- 1980- Radcliffe
- 1979- Boston University
- 1977- Radcliffe
- 1976- Boston University
