= Gregg Hartsuff =

American rower and rowing coach

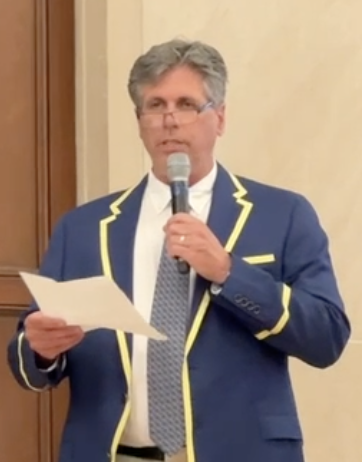
- Hartsuff in 2024

Current position
- Title: Head Coach
- Team: Michigan Men's Rowing Team

Biographical details
- Born: c. 1968; Gregory, Michigan
- Education: Grand Valley State University

Coaching career (HC unless noted)
- 1994–present: University of Michigan

Head coaching record
- Overall: 1631–407 (.800)

Accomplishments and honors

Championships
- ACRA; 15x Men's Team Points: 2008–2019, 2022, 2023, 2025; 8x Men's Varsity 8+: 2008–2010, 2013–2016, 2018; Dad Vail Regatta; 5x Heavyweight 8+: 2005, 2009, 2011, 2012, 2014; Head of the Charles; 2x Collegiate 8+: 2014, 2018; World University Games; (gold) Men's 8+ (2015)

Awards
- USRowing Man of the Year (2015); Dad Vail Matt Ledwith Coach of the Year Award (2013); 3× ACRA National Coach of the Year

Gregg Hartsuff (born 1968) is an American rowing coach. He currently serves as the head coach of the University of Michigan's Men's Rowing Team. He began his University of Michigan coaching career as the novice men's co-coach in the fall of 1992 and became head coach in 1994. In 2007, he led the effort to form the American Collegiate Rowing Association and served as the organization's first president from 2007 to 2013. He is recognized as the all-time winningest club coach in U.S. college rowing history.

== Early life and education ==
Hartsuff was born in Gregory, Michigan. He graduated from Stockbridge High School in 1986.

He began his rowing career at Grand Valley State University in 1986, where he rowed for four years. From 1988 to 1990, he co-coached the novice men and women at Grand Valley State.

== Head Coach of Michigan (1994 to present) ==
In 1992, Hartsuff was hired as the novice men's co-coach for the University of Michigan's men's rowing team. In 1994 he was promoted to serve as head coach. Since then, the team has been the most successful collegiate rowing club in the United States. Hartsuff's teams have earned more than 140 medals at the Dad Vail Regatta, Eastern Association of Rowing Colleges regatta, and American Collegiate Rowing Association championship. Hartsuff is only one of two coaches to win both the ECAC and Dad Vail Varsity 8 title in the same year (2005). In 2013, Hartsuff was awarded the Dad Vail Matt Ledwith Coach of the year award.

Additionally, under Hartsuff's coaching, the Michigan Varsity 8 has had the highest finish at the Intercollegiate Rowing Association championship of any club team. He oversaw the Freshman 8 take silver at IRA's in 2002, which is the best eights finish by a club team at the varsity national championships. In 2004, he coached the Varsity 4 to the bronze medal at IRA's.

In 2007, after collegiate club rowing programs were excluded from the Intercollegiate Rowing Association, Hartsuff led the effort to form the American Collegiate Rowing Association, which has grown to over 1500 participants and 60 clubs in the years since. He served as the organization's first president from 2007 to 2013, and currently serves as the organization's secretary.

In 2008, Hartsuff coached the Men's Varsity 8 at University of Michigan to the inaugural American Collegiate Rowing Association National Championship. Since then, under his coaching, the Michigan Men's Varsity 8 has placed first at ACRA in 2009, 2010, 2013, 2014, 2015, 2016, and 2018.

Michigan won fourteen consecutive ACRA Men's Team Point Trophies from 2008 to 2023 (in 2020 and 2021 the regatta was cancelled due to the COVID-19 pandemic), as well as in 2025.

== International career ==
At Michigan, Hartsuff has coached three future Olympians. In 2003, Hartsuff served as the USRowing Men's Heavyweight Single Scull team's coach at the 2003 World Rowing Championships in Milan, Italy.

In 2015, he coached the gold-medal-winning men’s eight at the World University Games. In 2018, he served as the head coach of the World University Championships team. He was once again appointed to serve as head coach in 2026.

In 2015, Hartsuff was named the USRowing Man of the Year.

== Personal life ==
Hartsuff lives in Chelsea, Michigan with his wife and three sons. He continues to row recreationally.
