= Mid-Atlantic Rowing Conference =

- Founded: 2009
- Sports fielded: 1; men's: 8; women's: 12
- No. of teams: 13
- Official website: marcrowing.com

The Mid-Atlantic Rowing Conference (MARC) is a men's and women's intercollegiate rowing conference.

== History ==
The Mid-Atlantic Rowing Conference was established in January 2009 by nine charter member schools: Bryn Mawr College, Franklin & Marshall College, Johns Hopkins University, Marietta College, University of Mary Washington, North Park University, Richard Stockton College, Rutgers University–Camden, and Washington College. These nine schools previously held annually the Atlantic Collegiate League Sprints Championships. Johns Hopkins announced that same year it would end its varsity rowing programs after the 2008-09 season. Two more charter schools discontinued its sponsorship of the sport, the University of Mary Washington, following the completion of the 2013-14 academic year, and Rutgers University–Camden following the completion of the 2015-16 academic year.

2015 brought the first expansion of the MARC, when first-year varsity women's program Johnson & Wales University joined the league. The conference welcomed two more new members in 2016: St. Mary's College of Maryland and Cabrini University, and four more in 2018: Adrian College, Bucknell University, Catholic University and Ohio Wesleyan University, increasing the membership to thirteen.

== Members ==
School	Oar blade	Location	Women's	Men's
Adrian College		Adrian, Michigan	✓	✓
Bryn Mawr College Owls		Lower Merion Township, Pennsylvania	✓	
Bucknell Bison		Lewisburg, Pennsylvania		✓
Cabrini University Cavaliers		Radnor, Pennsylvania	✓	
Catholic University Cardinals		Washington, D.C.	✓	✓
Franklin & Marshall College Diplomats		Lancaster, Pennsylvania	✓	✓
George Washington University Revolutionaries		Washington, D.C.		✓
Johnson & Wales University Wildcats		Providence, Rhode Island	✓	
Lehigh Mountain Hawks		Bethlehem, Pennsylvania		✓
Marietta College Pioneers		Marietta, Ohio	✓	✗
North Park University Vikings		Chicago, Illinois	✓	
Ohio Wesleyan Battling Bishops		Delaware, Ohio	✓	
St. Mary's Seahawks		St. Mary's City, Maryland	✓	✓
Stockton University Ospreys		Galloway Township, New Jersey	✓	✓
Washington College Shoremen and Shorewomen		Chestertown, Maryland	✓	✓
