= Catholic University Cardinals rowing =

American rowing club

Catholic University Cardinals Rowing
- University: Catholic University of America
- Athletic director: Kevin Robinson
- Head coach: Katie O'Driscoll
- Conference: MARC; III Division
- Location: Port Towns Community Boathouse, Bladensburg Waterfront Park
- Area of Practice: Anacostia River
- Colors: Cardinal red and black

Catholic University Cardinals rowing teams represent the Catholic University Cardinals in men's and women's intercollegiate rowing.

== History ==
=== Club (1990–2018) ===
Catholic University of America Rowing Association (CUARA) blade

The program was founded as a club called The Catholic University of America Rowing Association (CUARA) and competed in the Mid-Atlantic Region of the American Collegiate Rowing Association.

The club was established at the beginning of the spring semester 1990 by Laurie McGuane, an architecture major from Denver who transferred to Catholic University of America after her freshman year at Loyola Marymount University in Los Angeles. Disappointed that CUA did not have a rowing club, she decided to start one. In January 1990, the Crew Club was granted official club status by the university.

The spring semester of 1990 was devoted to organizing the club, starting fund-raising, and making contacts with the Washington, D.C. rowing network. The first coaches were Glenn Harchar and Bob Shuttleworth, who both coached for Capital Rowing Club at Thompson’s.

The following year (1991–92), with Laurie McGuane still president, Gregory Rubbo VP, Chris McBride "purser," and Meg Murphy, secretary, Glenn continued to serve as coach of the novice women, Ed McCormick coached our men, and Bill our varsity women. In the spring semester, Doug Sanders, who was a grad student in physics at CUA, became the coach of all our crews.

In 1992-93, Joe Creed started coaching. In the 1996-97 season, the Women’s Novice Eight, stroked by Rosanna Brunelli, became the first crew in CUARA history to win a gold medal. They won the Bill Braxton Regatta, beating Temple, Delaware, and UConn.

In the fall of 2002, John and Bridgette Dziedzic joined as assistant coaches and became head coaches of the men's and women's teams, respectively, after Joe Creed resigned. The team had a rebuilding year.

The 2004 Spring Season was the most successful year, to date, for the team. The Men's Four, including Alan Van Epps, Matt Starr, Brian Flynn, Mark Freibott, and James Hood, had a strong showing, winning gold at Occoquan Sprints and the St. Mary's Seahawks Regatta. The Varsity Lightweight Women's Four (Catherine Mancusi, Stephanie Callaghan, Erin Curry, Jackie Racicot, and Lindsay Capidulupo) won three medals (gold at Knecht Cup and St. Mary's Seahawks Sprint and bronze at the Mid-Atlantic Championship Regatta and a second-place finish at the Occoquan Sprints).

In 2008 the team was in decline due to lack of interest by the student body and a lack of commitment by members of the team. The team fell under the direction of James Augone, as Coaches John and Bridgette Dziedzic resigned after six years to start their family. Coach Augone formerly rowed at Iona College in New Rochelle, New York.

In the 2011-2012 rowing season, Sally O'Connor took over as head coach and in March 2012 Ryan Gillis became the new president. The team is showing promise under the new leadership and in the fall of 2012 posted a respectable finish at the Bill Braxton Regatta taking 2nd in the Men's Novice 4+ only to Temple University. The winter season was seen to have played out nicely for the once again thriving team. After the generous support of Catholic U and various other contributors the team was able to purchase an Empacher 8+ from the US Rowing National Team. Preparations were made to make way for the return of the once annual Capitol Crew Classic Regatta, which, according to University records, was last hosted by The Catholic University of America Rowing Association in 2005 with a total of 13 collegiate level teams in attendance.

=== Varsity Program (since 2018) ===
In 2018, the club transitioned into men's and women's varsity programs. Katie O'Driscoll was hired to lead the transition and take the helm of the Division III varsity programs. Catholic University subsequently joined the Mid-Atlantic Rowing Conference (MARC), with the men's team also participating in the Intercollegiate Rowing Association The Cardinals first appearance at the Mid-Atlantic Rowing Conference (MARC) Championships was 2019. In 2022, Catholic University Men's Rowing participated in the Men's Coxed Four event at the Intercollegiate Rowing Association National Championships, finishing sixth in the fourth level final.

== Coaches ==
- Bob Shuttleworth 1990-1991
- Glenn Harchar 1990-1992
- Ed McCormick 1991-1992
- Doug Sanders 1992
- Joe Creed 1992-2002
- John and Bridgette Dziedzic 2002-2008
- James Augone 2008
- Tim Pineau 2010
- Kevin McNamara 2010
- Ben Newell 2010
- Beth Gordon 2012
- Sally O’Connor 2012–2017
- Katie O'Driscoll 2019-Present

== Mid-Atlantic Rowing Conference Championships ==
Men's Varsity 8+
Year	Venue	Place	Time
2019	Pinchot Lake, Pennsylvania	9th	7:06.96
2021	Mercer Lake, New Jersey	3rd	6:34.70
2022	Occoquan Reservoir, Virginia	6th	6:20.08

Men's Second Varsity 8+
Year	Venue	Place	Time
2022	Occoquan Reservoir, Virginia	2nd	6:42.60

Women's Varsity 8+
Year	Venue	Place	Time
2019	Pinchot Lake, Pennsylvania	8th	7:52.15
2021	Mercer Lake, New Jersey	5th	7:23.80
2022	Occoquan Reservoir, Virginia	7th	7:32.60

Women's Second Varsity 8+
Year	Venue	Place	Time
2022	Occoquan Reservoir, Virginia	5th	8:25.60

No event was held in 2020 due to the COVID-19 pandemic.

== Intercollegiate Rowing Association Championships ==
Men's Varsity 4+ (4th Level Final)
Year	Venue	Place	Time
2022	Mercer Lake, New Jersey	6th	6:57.663
