= Michigan Men's Rowing Team =

University of Michigan rowing team

Michigan Men's Rowing

- Location: Ann Arbor, Michigan
- Home water: Argo Dam Reservoir, Huron River
- Founded: 1976; 50 years ago
- Key people: Gregg Hartsuff (Head Coach)
- University: University of Michigan
- Affiliations: American Collegiate Rowing Association
- Website: https://michiganrowing.org/

The Michigan Men's Rowing Team is the men's rowing team that represents the University of Michigan. The team was founded in 1976 by Robert Verbrugge and competes as a varsity club team as a member of the American Collegiate Rowing Association. Since 1994, Gregg Hartsuff has served as head coach and under his leadership, the team has been recognized as the most successful collegiate club rowing team in the United States, winning more than 140 medals at the Dad Vail Regatta, Eastern Association of Rowing Colleges regatta, and American Collegiate Rowing Association championship. The team has produced four Olympians and has won 15 ACRA National Championships.

== History ==
The team was founded in 1976 by Robert Verbrugge, who had been surprised by the lack of a rowing team affiliated with the University. In 1984, a boathouse was built by the team on the shores of the Huron River, along the Argo Dam pond.

In 1994, head coach Gregg Hartsuff was hired by the team. Since then, the team has become one of the most successful collegiate rowing clubs in the country. The Michigan Varsity 8 consistently had the highest finish at the Intercollegiate Rowing Association championship of any club team and in 2002, the Freshman Eight placed second, which is the best eights finish by a club team at the varsity national championships.

In 2007, after collegiate club rowing programs were excluded from the Intercollegiate Rowing Association, Hartsuff led the effort to form the American Collegiate Rowing Association. Michigan Men's Rowing was one of the founding members of the organization, and since then, Michigan's Varsity 8 has placed first at ACRA eight times, and the team has won a number of men's team points trophies, including a series of consecutive wins from 2008 until 2023. In 2025, they once again won a record fifteenth men's team point trophy.

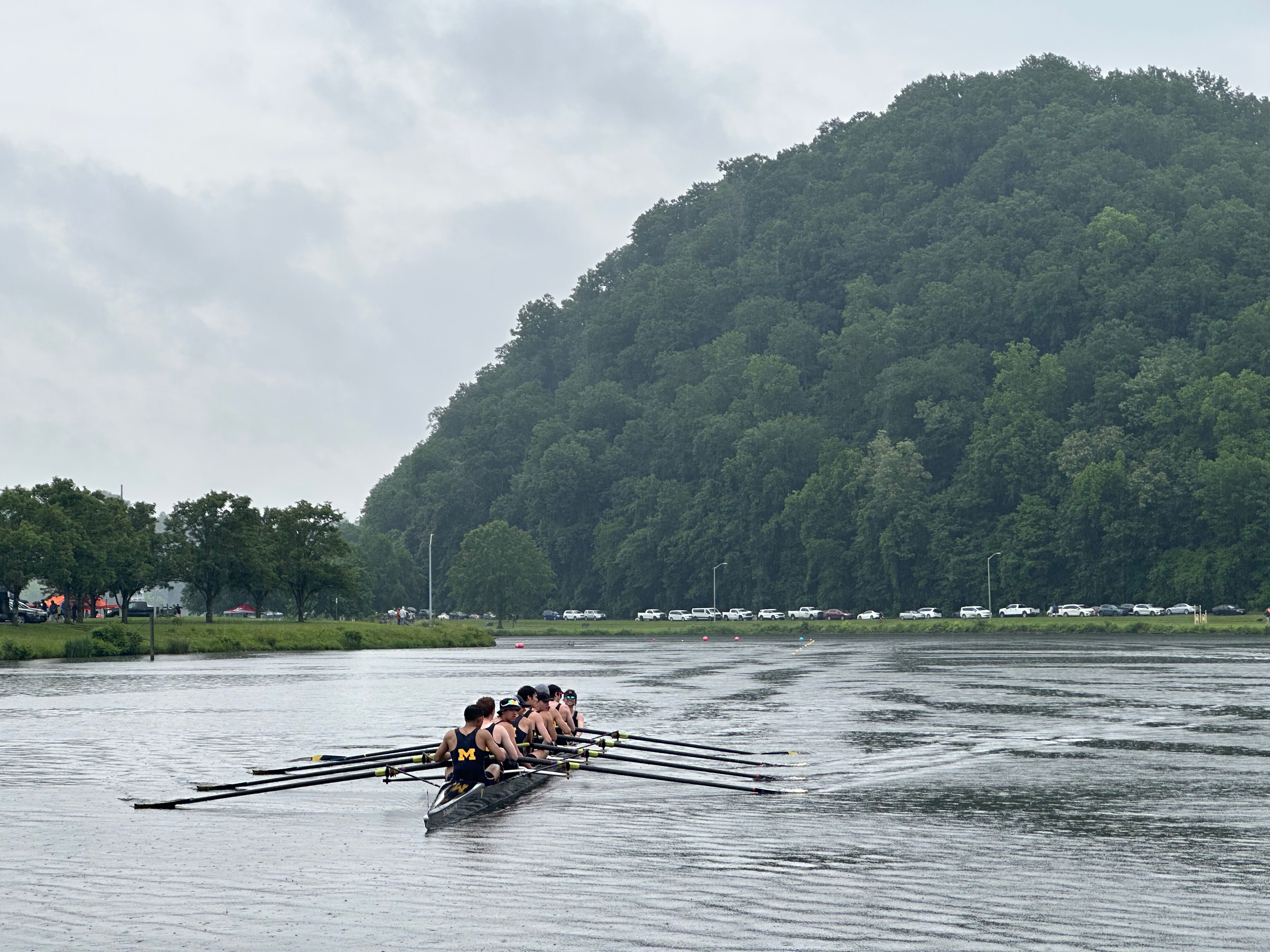
The Michigan Men's Rowing 2nd Freshman eight returning to the dock after placing first at ACRA in 2023.

As a varsity club sport, the team is reliant on fundraising and donor support instead of direct university funding, with significant support from the Michigan Rowing Association (MRA) alumni organization. In 2018, the MRA purchased an indoor training facility for the team. In 2023, the team moved to a new, larger facility.

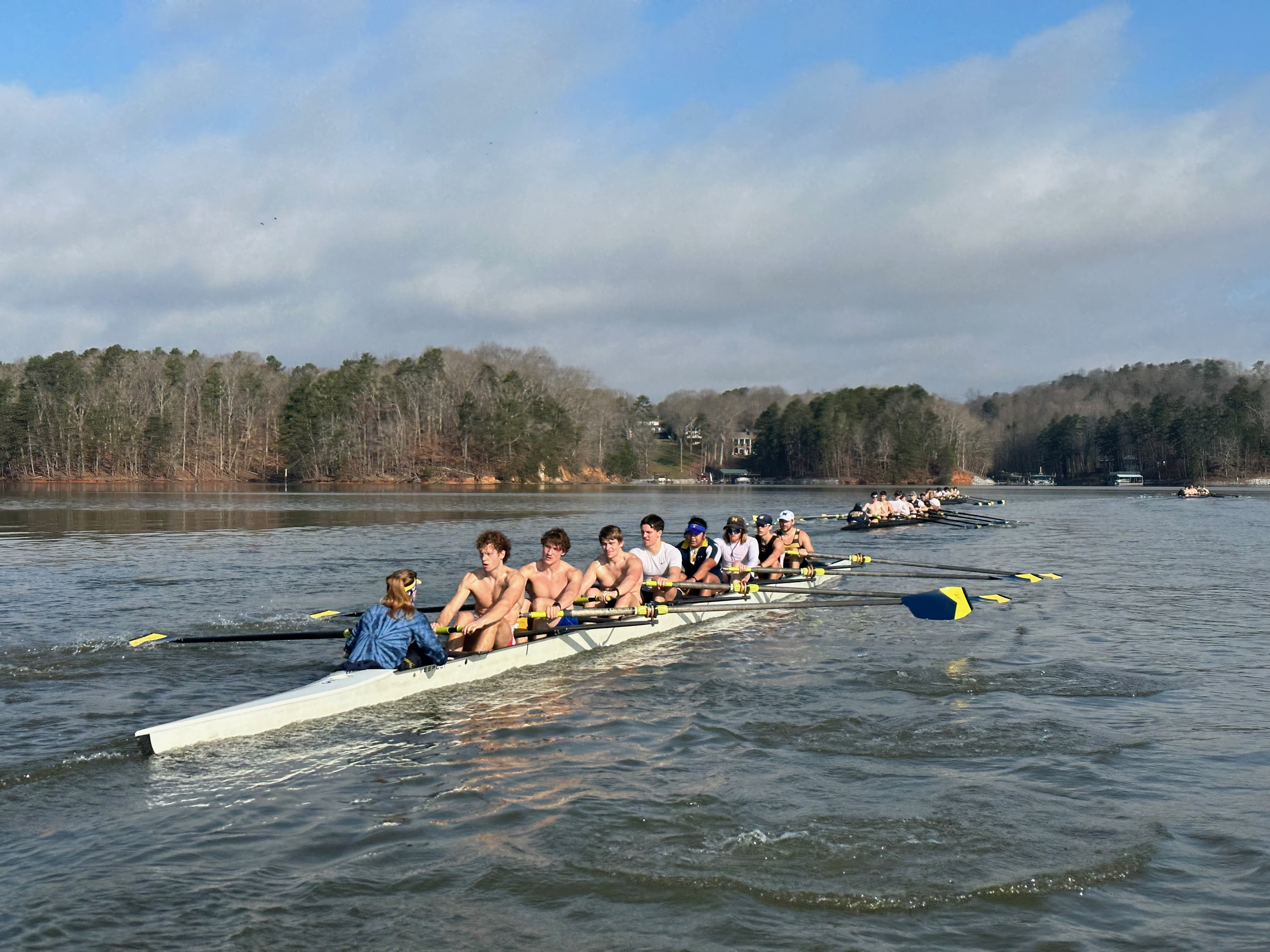
A Michigan Men's Rowing eight during spring training on Lake Lanier in 2023.

== Notable results ==
=== American Collegiate Rowing Association Championship ===
- 69 medals in total
- Men's Varsity Eight (First Place): 2008, 2009, 2010, 2013, 2014, 2015, 2016, 2018
- Men's Points Trophy: 2008, 2009, 2010, 2011, 2012, 2013, 2014, 2015, 2016, 2017, 2018, 2019, 2022, 2023, 2025
- Overall Team Points Trophy: 2018, 2019, 2023

=== Dad Vail Regatta ===
- 75 medals in total
- Men's Heavyweight Eight (First Place): 2005, 2009, 2011, 2012, 2014
- Men's JV Eight (First Place): 1995, 2012, 2013
- Kerr Trophy Men's Points: 2009 (tied with Delaware), 2012, 2014, 2016

=== Intercollegiate Rowing Association (IRA) Championship ===
- Men's Freshman Eight (Second Place): 2002
- Men's Varsity Four (w/ coxswain) (Third Place): 2004

=== Head of the Charles Regatta ===
- Collegiate Eight (First Place): 2014, 2018
- Collegiate Eight (Second Place): 2012, 2013, 2016

== Personnel ==
The team consists of roughly forty experienced "varsity" rowers and a similar number of freshman athletes, as well as a dozen coxswains. Roughly 80% of recruits have no experience rowing before joining the team.

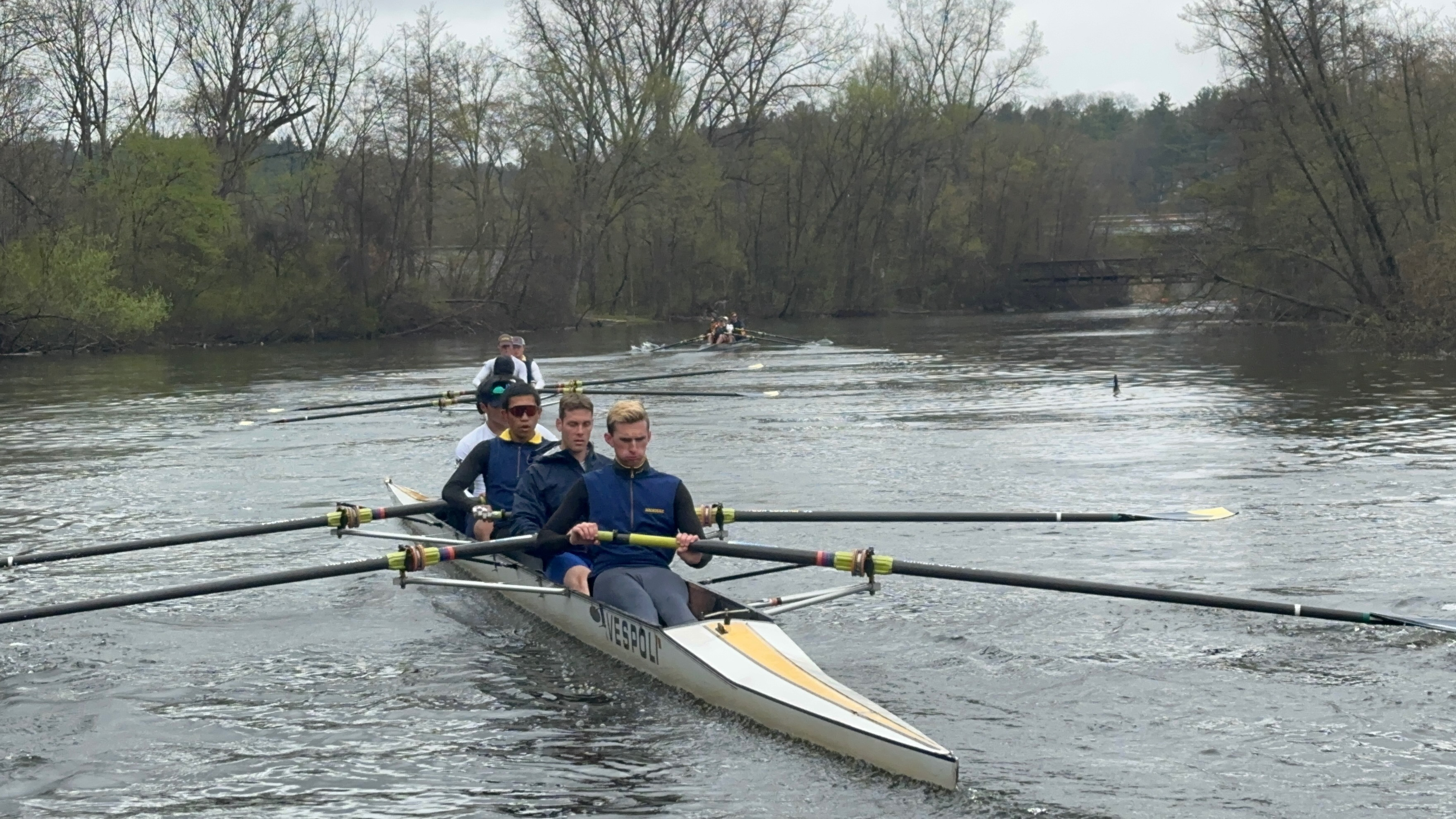
Team members practice on the Argo Dam Reservoir in 2023.

=== Coaches ===
- Gregg Hartsuff (Head Coach)
- Maggie Zimmer-Parsons (Assistant Varsity Coach)
- Jerry Hoffman (Assistant Freshman Coach)

== Notable alumni ==
- Steve Warner (2004 Summer Olympics)
- Kenneth Jurkowski (2008 Summer Olympics)
- Matt Hughes (2008 Summer Olympics)
- Thomas Peszek (2012 Summer Olympics)
- Zachary Burns (2016 Summer Paralympics - Silver Medalist, Legs, Trunk, & Arms Mixed Four)
- Wesley Vear (2019 Pan American Games)
