= Eastern Association of Women's Rowing Colleges =

College athletic conference

The Eastern Association of Women's Rowing Colleges (EAWRC) is a college athletic conference of eighteen women's college rowing crew teams. The conference is an affiliate of the Eastern College Athletic Conference (ECAC).

== Members ==
See footnote

- Boston College
- Boston University
- Brown University
- Columbia University
- Cornell University
- Dartmouth College
- Georgetown University
- George Washington University
- Massachusetts Institute of Technology
- Northeastern University
- University of Pennsylvania
- Princeton University
- Radcliffe (Harvard)
- Rutgers University
- Syracuse University
- United States Naval Academy
- University of Wisconsin–Madison
- Yale University

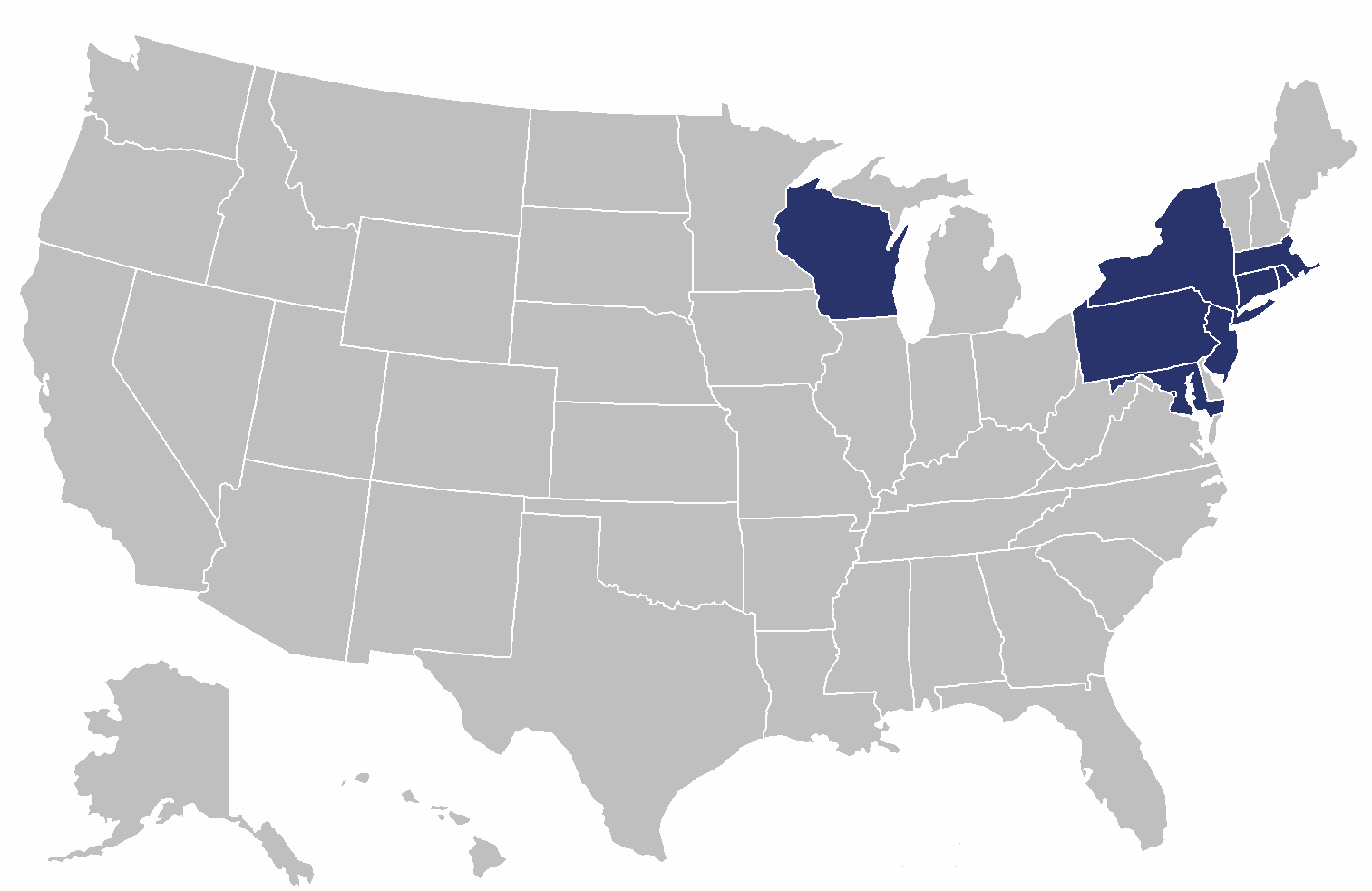
Map of states where participating institutions are located

== See also ==
- Eastern Association of Rowing Colleges (men)
