= Go BU =

Fight song of Boston University

"Go BU" is the traditional fight song of Boston University. The lyrics and music were written by Ranny Weeks and Bernie Fazioli, and it was arranged by Joe Levin. Line 7 was originally written as "Down the field to score anew" in reference to the university's now discontinued football team. "Field" is now modified to "ice" or "court" to support other teams such as hockey or basketball. The song is performed by the Boston University Pep Band at most BU sporting events, such as after BU hockey team goals. It is also performed as a recessional hymn at the university's annual commencement ceremony.
