= American Collegiate Rowing Association =

American governing body of college rowing

American Collegiate Rowing Association (ACRA) is one of the governing bodies of college rowing in the United States, together with the National Collegiate Athletic Association (NCAA) and the Intercollegiate Rowing Association (IRA).

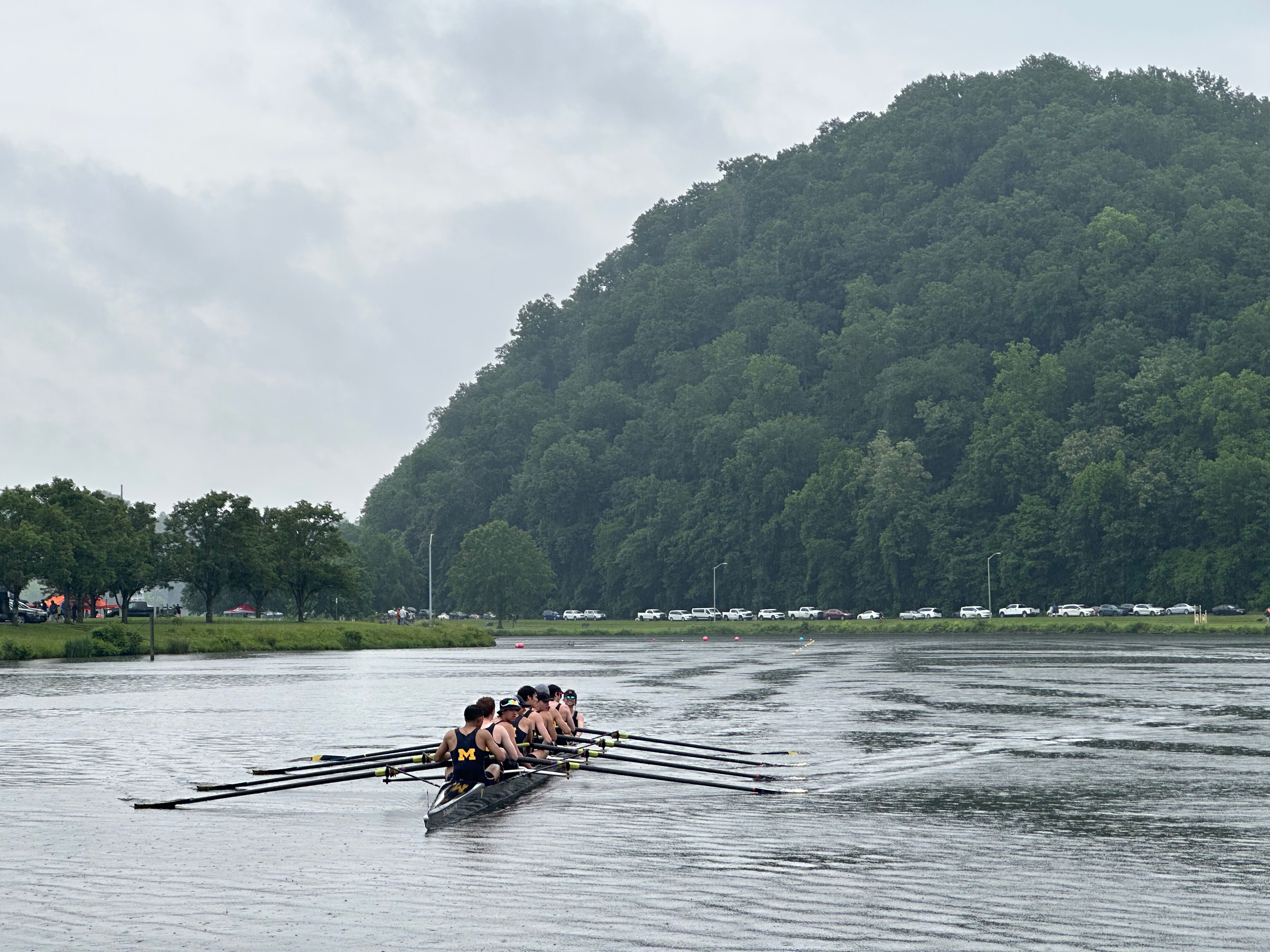
A Michigan Freshman 8+ returning to the dock at the 2023 ACRA championship.

== History ==
Established in 2008 by Michigan Men's Rowing's head coach Gregg Hartsuff under the General Not for Profit Association Act of 1986, the American Collegiate Rowing Association (ACRA) is made up of club-level collegiate rowing teams.

Before 2006, competitive club rowing programs, which receive little or no funding from their university athletic departments, were able to compete at the IRA Championship. During the 2006–2007 season, Rutgers University cut funding from its men's rowing program, reducing it to "club" status. Part of Rutgers's justification for cutting rowing was that clubs could compete equally with funded programs at the IRA Championships. To avoid other varsity program members from losing funding, the IRA excluded clubs from competing at its championship beginning in 2007. ACRA became an alternative championship for these clubs. It has since grown to include over 76 competing collegiate programs in 2024.

The ACRA National Championship Regatta is considered the National Championship for collegiate club programs and all programs outside the NCAA/IRA structure.

The regatta is split into six regions: the Mid-Atlantic region, the Great Lakes region, the Plains region, the Northeast region, the South region, and the West Coast region. The ACRA is a broadcast partner of The Rowers Consortium of Huntington Harbour, California, who has broadcast the regatta on The Rowing Channel since 2014.

ACRA is currently organized by a coach-elected board consisting of elected officers and representatives from each of the six regions. As of 2024, the board consists of the following members:

ACRA Coach-Elected Board
President	Dan Wolleben Bucknell University
Secretary	Gregg Hartsuff University of Michigan
Treasurer	Scott Armstrong University of Minnesota
Great Lakes Rep.	Peter Rosberg Michigan State University
Mid-Atlantic Rep.	Frank Biller University of Virginia
Northeast Rep.	Doug Welling Bowdoin University
Plains Rep.	Rachel Tuck Wichita State University
South Rep.	Jon Miller Vanderbilt University
West Coast Rep.	Peter Brevick Washington State University

== Members ==
=== ACRA Schools ===
Mid-Atlantic Region	Great Lakes Region	Plains Region	Northeast Region	South Region	West Coast Region
Bucknell University	Augustana College	Baylor University	Amherst College	Auburn University	Arizona State University
Carnegie Mellon University	Butler University	Colorado State University	Boston College	University of Alabama	California State University-Long Beach
George Mason University	Case Western Reserve University	Iowa State University	Bowdoin College	University of Central Florida	California State University Maritime Academy
George Washington University	Cleveland State University	Kansas State University	Canisius College	Clemson University	Chapman University
Haverford College	Denison University	Macalester College	Clarkson University	College of Charleston	Humboldt State University
Lafayette College	DePaul University	University of Missouri	Endicott College	Davidson University	Loyola Marymount University
Lehigh University	Grand Valley State University	Oklahoma State University	Fordham University	Duke University	Menlo College
Liberty University	IUPUI	Rice University	Gordon College	Emory University	Nevada State College
Penn State University	John Carroll University	St. Cloud State University	Manhattan College	University of Florida	Orange Coast College
Rutgers University	Lawrence University	St. John's University and College of St. Benedict	Middlebury College	Florida Institute of Technology	Portland State University
Rutgers University-Camden	Marquette University	St. Louis University	Rensselaer Polytechnic Institute	Florida State University	Sacramento State University
Stockton University	Miami University (OH)	St. Olaf College	Stony Brook University	University of Georgia	San Diego State University
Susquehanna University	Michigan State University	St. Edwards University	SUNY at Albany	Georgia State University	Seattle University
The College of New Jersey	Michigan Tech University	Texas A&M University	SUNY at Buffalo	Georgia Tech	University of California-Berkeley Lightweights
University of Delaware	Northern Michigan University	Texas Christian University	SUNY at Geneseo	High Point University	University of California-Davis
University of Maryland	Northwestern University	University of Colorado	SUNY at Binghamton	Louisiana State University	University of California-Irvine
University of Maryland-Baltimore	Ohio State University	University of Denver	SUNY at Oswego	Murray State University	University of California-Santa Barbara
University of Pittsburgh	Ohio University	University of Iowa	United States Military Academy	University of North Carolina	University of California-Los Angeles
University of Richmond	Purdue University	University of Kansas	University of Connecticut	North Carolina State University	University of Oregon
University of Virginia	University of Cincinnati	University of Minnesota	University of Maine	Northwestern State University	University of Southern California
Villanova University	University of Chicago	University of Missouri-Kansas City	University of Massachusetts-Amhert	University of Tennessee	Washington State University
Virginia Tech	University of Dayton	University of Nebraska-Lincoln	University of Massachusetts-Lowell	University of Tennessee-Chattanooga	Western Washington University
West Virginia University	University of Illinois	University of Oklahoma	University of New Hampshire	Tulane University	
College of William & Mary	University of Michigan	University of St. Thomas	University of Rhode Island	The University of the South	
	University of Notre Dame	University of Texas	University of Rochester	Vanderbilt University	
	University of Toledo	Washington University in St. Louis	University of Vermont	Wake Forest University	
	Wheaton College	Wichita State University			
	Xavier University				

== Champions ==
=== Varsity 8+ ===
Year	Men	Women
2008	Michigan	Ohio State University
2009	Michigan	Grand Valley State
2010	Michigan	Purdue
2011	Virginia	Purdue
2012	Virginia	Grand Valley State
2013	Michigan	Grand Valley State
2014	Michigan	Grand Valley State
2015	Michigan	Grand Valley State
2016	Michigan	UCSB
2017	UC Santa Barbara	UCSB
2018	Michigan	UCSB
2019	Delaware	UCSB
2020	Not held due to COVID-19 Pandemic	Not held due to COVID-19 Pandemic
2021	Not held due to COVID-19 Pandemic	Not held due to COVID-19 Pandemic
2022	George Washington	Grand Valley State
2023	UCLA	Bowdoin
2024	Notre Dame	Vanderbilt
2025	Virginia	Vanderbilt
2026	Purdue	Middlebury

=== Team Points ===
Year	Men	Women	Overall
2008	Michigan	Grand Valley State	Ohio State University
2009	Michigan	Grand Valley State	Grand Valley State
2010	Michigan	Grand Valley State	Grand Valley State
2011	Michigan	Grand Valley State	Grand Valley State
2012	Michigan	Grand Valley State	Grand Valley State
2013	Michigan	Grand Valley State	Grand Valley State
2014	Michigan	Grand Valley State	UCSB
2015	Michigan	UCSB	UCSB
2016	Michigan	UCSB	UCSB
2017	Michigan	UCSB	UCSB
2018	Michigan	UCSB	Michigan
2019	Michigan	University of Florida	Michigan
2020	Not held due to COVID-19 Pandemic	Not held due to COVID-19 Pandemic	Not held due to COVID-19 Pandemic
2021	Not held due to COVID-19 Pandemic	Not held due to COVID-19 Pandemic	Not held due to COVID-19 Pandemic
2022	Michigan	Purdue	Purdue
2023	Michigan	Bowdoin	Michigan
2024	Purdue	Purdue	Purdue
2025	Michigan	Bowdoin	Purdue
2026	Purdue	Purdue	Purdue
