= Eastern Association of Rowing Colleges =

College athletic conference

The Eastern Association of Rowing Colleges (EARC) is a college athletic conference of fifteen men's college rowing crews. It is an affiliate of the Eastern College Athletic Conference (ECAC).

== Members ==
Fifteen colleges and universities are members of the EARC, mostly in the North-East and Mid-Atlantic United States, but also in the Mid-West with the University of Wisconsin–Madison. All eight Ivy League universities are members of the EARC.

- Boston University
- Brown University
- Columbia University
- Cornell University
- Dartmouth College
- Georgetown University
- Harvard University
- College of the Holy Cross
- Massachusetts Institute of Technology
- Northeastern University
- University of Pennsylvania
- Princeton University
- Syracuse University
- United States Naval Academy
- University of Wisconsin–Madison
- Yale University
School Locations. Boston and Washington have multiple EARC schools and are marked in red.

== See also ==
- Eastern Association of Women's Rowing Colleges
