= College Boat Club =

Rowing program at the University of Pennsylvania

Coordinates: 39.96948°N 75.18590°W

- Location: #11 Boathouse Row, Philadelphia, Pennsylvania, U.S.
- Home water: Schuylkill River
- Established: 1872; 154 years ago
- Navy admission: 1875
- Former names: College Barge Club
- Key people: Al Monte (Hwt Men's Coach); Colin Farrell (Lwt Men's Coach); Bill Manning (Women's Coach); Alanna Wren (Athletics Director)
- Nickname: Quakers, Men of Penn
- University: University of Pennsylvania
- Conference: Eastern Association of Rowing Colleges; Ivy League
- Association: NCAA Division I (Women only)
- Colors: Red and Blue
- Website: pennathletics.com/rowing
- College Boat Club
- U.S. Historic district – Contributing property
- Philadelphia Register of Historic Places
- Location within Pennsylvania Location within the United States
- Location: Philadelphia, Pennsylvania, U.S.
- Part of: Boathouse Row (ID87000821)
- Added to NRHP: February 27, 1987

The College Boat Club of the University of Pennsylvania is the rowing program for University of Pennsylvania Rowing, which is located in the Burk-Bergman Boathouse at #11 Boathouse Row on the historic Boathouse Row of Philadelphia, Pennsylvania. Its membership consists entirely of past and present rowers of the University of Pennsylvania.

It hosts both heavyweight and lightweight varsity men's teams and an openweight varsity women's team. The Wharton Crew Team, however, rows out of Fairmount Rowing Association (FRA). College Boat Club was founded in 1872 by the school's students, shortly after the school's campus was relocated from Center City to West Philadelphia. College Boat Club was admitted to the Schuylkill Navy in 1875.

== History ==
=== University Barge Club ===
The history of rowing at the University of Pennsylvania began in 1854 with the foundation of the University Barge Club.

=== Founding of College Boat Club ===
In 1872, University of Pennsylvania ("Penn") students founded the College Barge Club to provide an alternative to the school's first boat club, the University Barge Club, and to focus on preparing students for intercollegiate competitions. The Club later changed its name from College Barge Club to College Boat Club.

In the club's first year, it had only 20 members, mostly sophomores from the university's graduating Class of 1875. At first, the Club rowed out of the Quaker City Barge Club. However, College Boat Club grew quickly and was able to build its own boathouse in 1874.

In 1877, sophomores from College Boat Club were victorious against seniors rowing out of University Barge Club. By 1879, the club was the base for most Penn crews, and members were rowing in intercollegiate competitions. In 1893, College Boat Club opened membership to alumni as well as enrolled students. In 1904, the Club admitted alumni crews as far back as 1899. Currently, membership for alumni is limited to former varsity rowers.

== Competitions ==
The crews of College Boat Club compete in several regattas throughout the rowing season. The three most competitive regattas are the Eastern Association of Rowing College (EARC) Championship, the Intercollegiate Rowing Association (IRA) Championship, and the Henley Royal Regatta. As of 1997, the women's crews compete in the NCAA Division I Rowing Championship instead of the IRAs.

=== EARC Championship (Eastern Sprints) ===
The Penn heavyweight men's eight has won the Eastern Sprints six times: 1955, 1962 (tied with Yale), 1986, 1991, 1996, and 1998.

The lightweight men's eight has won 5 times: 1951, 1952, 1955, 1976, and 2019.

=== IRA Championship ===
Penn, along with Columbia and Cornell, founded the Intercollegiate Rowing Association and competes annually in the Intercollegiate Rowing Association Championship, which is the most competitive race in American collegiate rowing. In 2004, Penn finished fourth in the grand final for the Men's Freshman Four w/Cox and fifth in the Men's Open Four w/Cox grand final.

In 2005, Penn finished third in the Men's Varsity Lightweight Eight and fourth in the Men's Freshman Eight. In 2006, the Men's Freshman Eight finished third. In 2017 and 2019, the Men’s Varsity Lightweight 8 finished 2nd and 3rd, respectively.

In 2008, the Men's Open Four qualified for the grand final, but finished sixth. The last time that the Penn won the Ivy League Championship at IRAs was 1992, when Penn tied Dartmouth. Penn has won the Ivy League Championship eight additional times in 1898, 1899, 1900, 1967, 1968, 1969, 1972, and 1989.

=== Henley Royal Regatta ===
Penn Crew has competed at the prestigious Henley Royal Regatta. In 1994, College Boat Club won the Ladies' Challenge Plate. In 1991, Penn won the Thames Challenge Cup. In 1955, Penn won the most prestigious of all prizes at Henley, the Grand Challenge Cup. Penn also won the Thames Challenge Cup in 1951 and 1952.

=== National Collegiate Rowing Championship ===
The men's team won the National Collegiate Rowing Championship in 1991.

=== 1955 crew ===
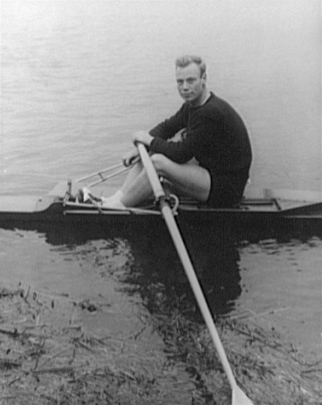
Joe Burk, "world’s greatest oarsman," WWII PT boat commander

The 1955 Men's Heavyweight 8, coached by Joe Burk, won at the Henley Regatta, and the crew's speed drew attention and acclaim internationally. One source highlights the accolades as follows:

Everywhere they competed, particularly in Germany, they were referred to as the world's fastest crew, and hence became models for local oarsmen.

To European observers, Penn seemed to defy the laws of physics that applied to all other crews. In their Henley semifinal, they had beaten Britain's best, Thames Rowing Club by a half-length of open water at a rating The Times termed "a majestic thirty."

The strength and speed of the Penn pullthrough, the endless run on the impossibly long recovery, seemed as unattainable in its own way as Joe Burk's sculling technique had seemed to them seventeen years earlier.

At their regatta in Hamburg, when Penn made its first impression on the German rowing community, one of the most interested spectators was Dr. Karl Adam of Ratzeburger Ruderklub. He was already working out a new international technique, initially under the influence of Steve Fairbairn.

Eight years later, Adam confessed to Joe Burk that he had returned home from Hamburg very depressed and wondering whether they could ever beat the invincible Americans.

— Peter Mallory, Evolution of the Rowing Stroke

== Coaching staff ==
Penn has enjoyed the tutelage of many of the best rowing coaches of all time including Rusty Callow, Joe Burk, Ted Nash, Stan Bergman, Brendan Cunningham, and Hudson Peters.

=== Ted Nash ===
In 2004, former Penn coach Ted Nash became the first person to participate in 10 Olympic games as either an athlete or coach when he was appointed as a coach on the 2004 team in Athens. This is a record for any member of any US Olympic team, regardless of event or sport. During his first games at the 1960 Rome Olympics, Nash raced in the gold medal-winning coxless four boat. In 2008 he showed no signs of slowing down as he returned again to the Olympic stage in Beijing as coach of the heavyweight men's coxless pair.

=== Women ===
- Head coach: Bill Manning
- Assistant coaches: Josie Konopka, Allyson Baker

=== Heavyweight men ===
- Head coach: Albert “Al” Monte
- Associate head coach: Phillip Brunner
- Assistant coaches: Fergal Barry and John "J.O.B" O'Brien
- Boatman: Mike Guerrieri

=== Lightweight men ===
- Head coach: Colin Farrell
- Assistant coach: Taylor Brown

== Gallery ==
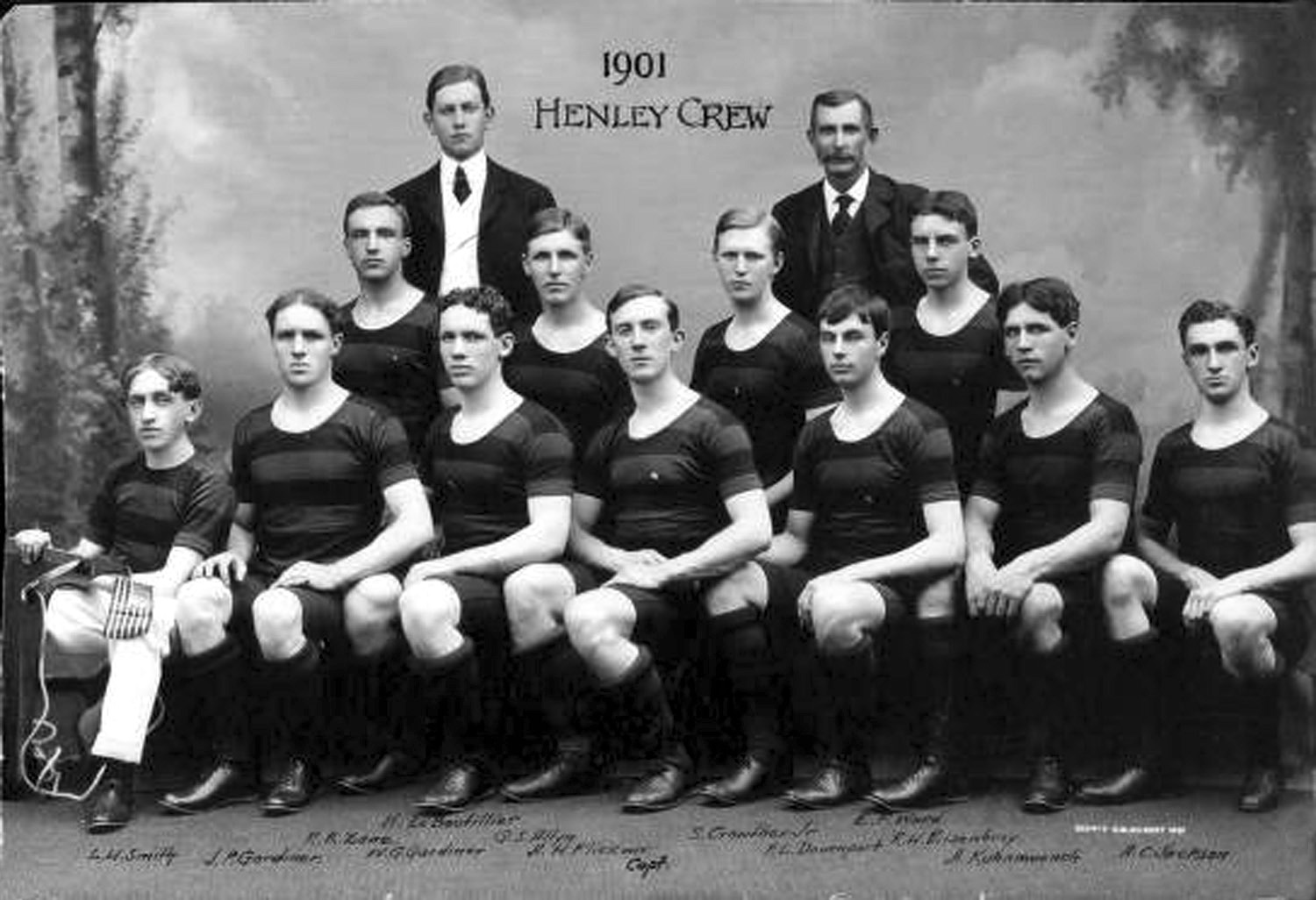
1901 crew

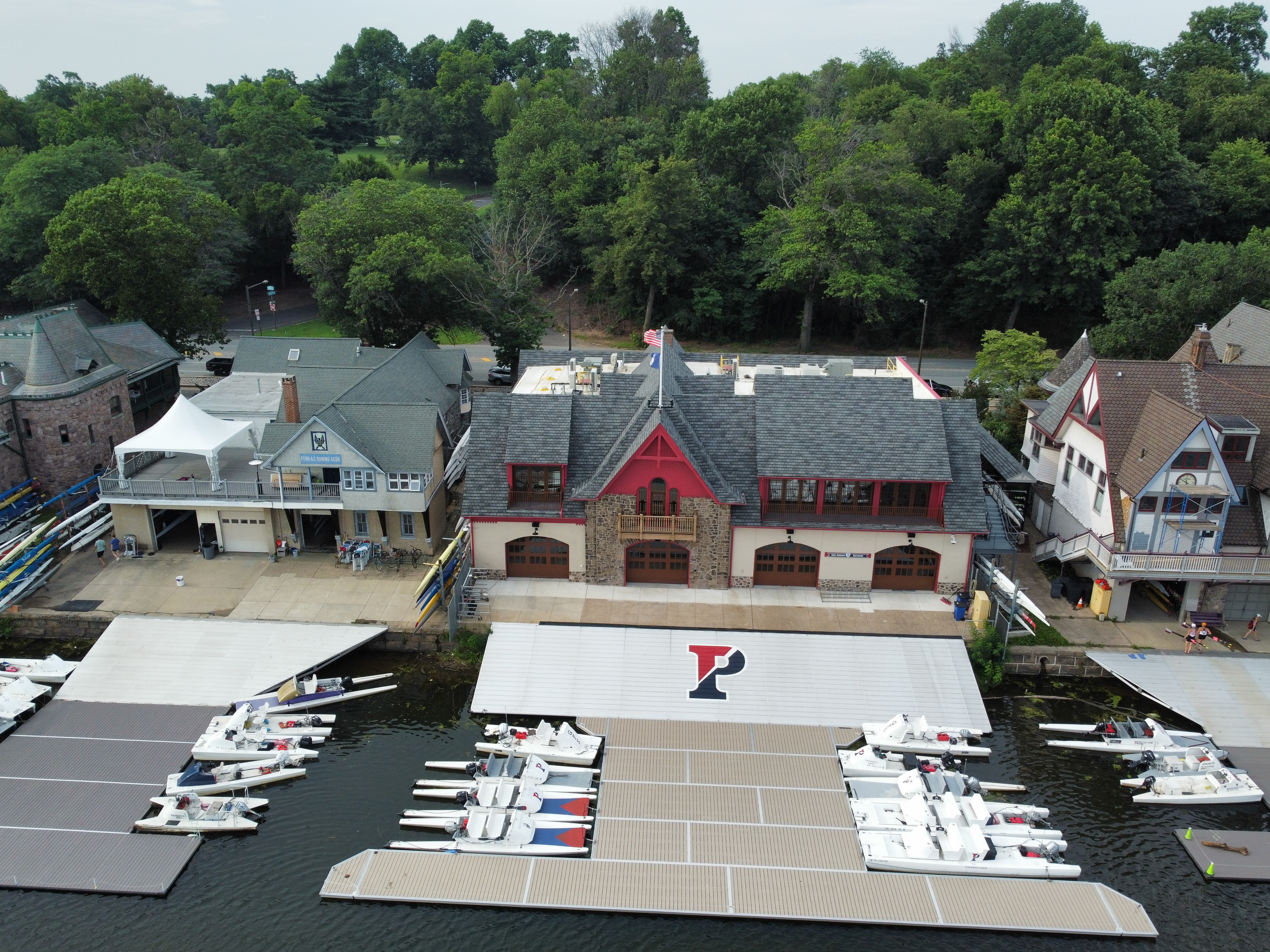
Aerial view of #11 Boathouse Row, College Boat home

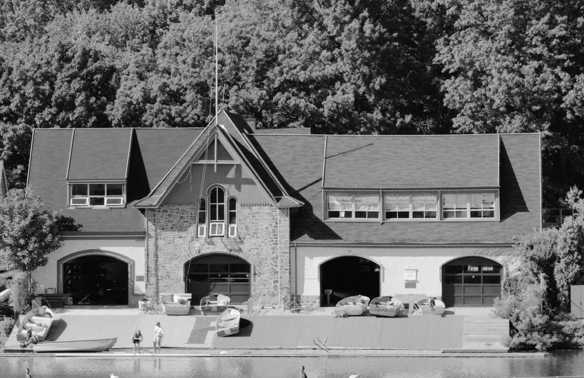
College Boat Club,
#11 Boathouse Row, in 1972.

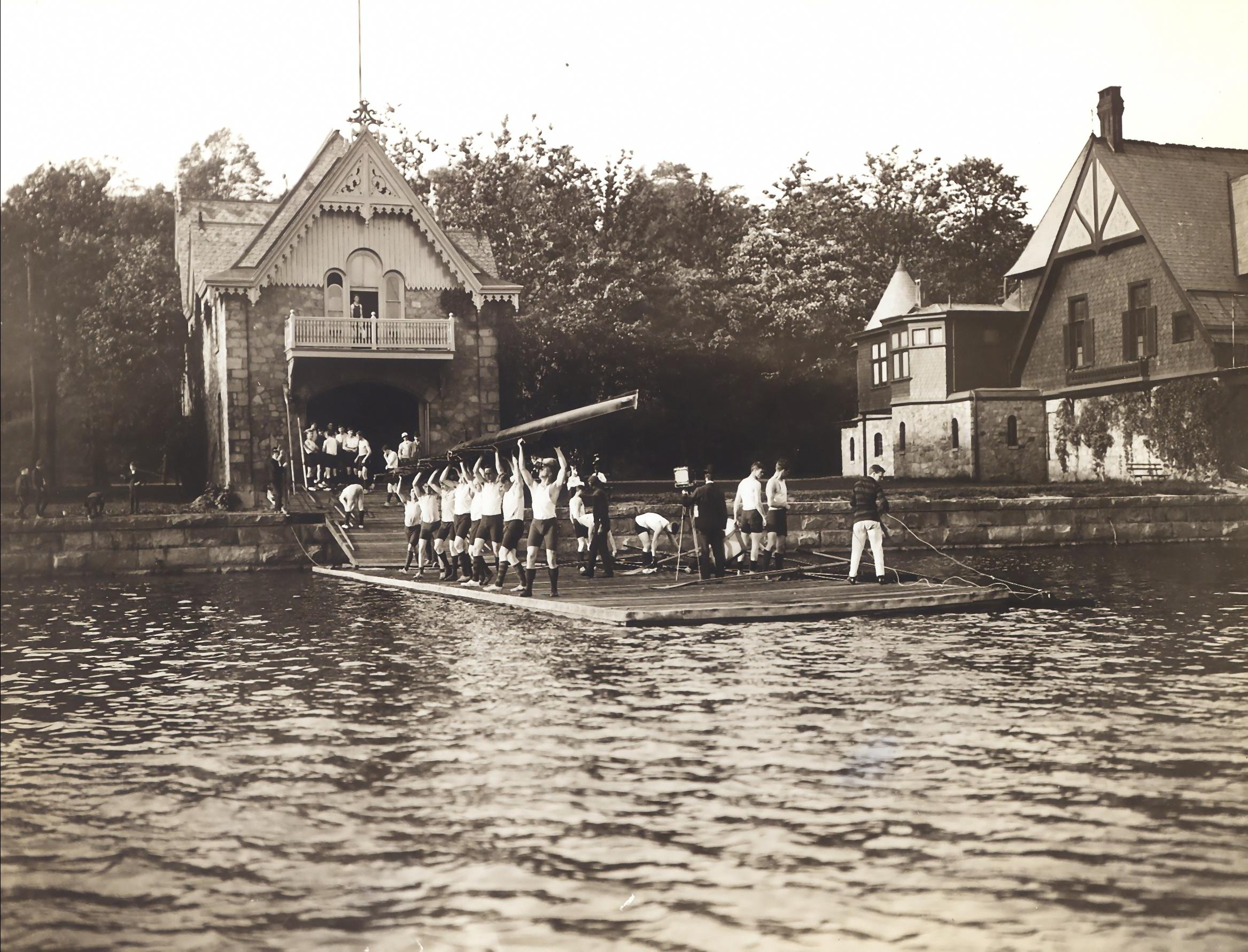
Crew launching shell of College Boat Club boathouse in 1904.

== Prominent members ==
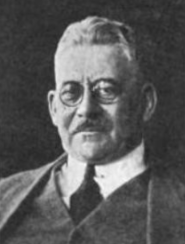
Joseph Walter Harris Wright, Penn coach

- Ted A. Nash (former Penn Coach) - 1960 (gold medal) & 1964 (bronze medal) US Olympic Teams and US Olympic Coach from 1968 to 2008
- Louis Lombardi, Jr., '15 - 2010 US Junior Team, 2014–15 US U23 Teams, 2016 US Senior Team. American actor, songwriter and record producer
- John A. Pescatore, '86 - 1988 (bronze medal) & 1992 US Olympic Teams
- Hugh Matheson, '84 - 1972, 1976 & 1980 Great Britain Olympic Teams (silver medal)
- James E. Moroney III '75 - 1972 & 1976 US Olympic Teams
- Luther H. Jones, '72 - 1968 & 1972 US Olympic Teams
- John Hartigan, '63 - 1968 & 1976 US Olympic Teams
- Harry Parker, '57 - 1960 US Olympic Team and US Olympic Coach 1964-1984
- John B. Kelly Jr., '50 - 1948, 1952, 1956 & 1960 US Olympic Teams

=== Rowers with one Olympic team appearance ===
These include:

1928 US Olympic Team: Charles J. McIlvaine '57

1936 US Olympic Team:

- George L. Dahm Jr. '40
- George G. Loveless '32

1940 US Olympic Team: Joseph Burk '34 (no games - WWII)

1952 US Olympic Team:

- James J. Beggs '56
- Russell S. Callow '30 (coach)

1956 US Olympic Team:

- James Wynne '60
- James McMullen '59

1960 US Olympic Team: Lyman S. Perry '68

1968 Canadian Olympic Team: W. Richard Crooker '72

1968 US Olympic Team:

- A. Gardner Cadwalader '71
- Anthony E. Martin III '70
- William K. Purdy '68

1972 US Olympic Team:

- Thomas W. Butterfoss '72
- Eugene H. Clapp III '72 (silver medal)
- Aaron B. Herman '74
- C. Hugh Stevenson '72

1976 Canadian Olympic Team: George H. Tintor '79

1976 US Olympic Team:

- James Catellan '74
- Steven E. Christensen '79
- Kenneth Dreyfuss '69, '77
- Laura Catherine Terdoslavich Staines '75
- Susan Morgan

1980 US Olympic Team:

- John A. Chatzky '78
- Steven E. Christensen '79
- Sean P. Colgan '77
- Bruce E. Epke '78
- Bruce Ibbetson '81
- Thomas Woodman '81

1984 US Olympic Team:

- Phillip W. Stekl '78 (silver medal)

1988 US Olympic Team:

- Jonathan B. Fish '84
- John E. Flobeck '87

1992 US Olympic Team: Bruce Konopka '78

1996 Australian Olympic Team: Janusz Hooker '93 (bronze medal)

1996 US Olympic Team:

- Mike Peterson '89
- Jeff Pfaendtner '90 (bronze medal)

2000 US Olympic Team: Garrett Miller '99

2008 US Olympic Team: Tom Paradiso '02
