= List of Alpha Chi Rho members =

Alpha Chi Rho is an American men's collegiate fraternity founded on June 4, 1895, at Trinity College in Hartford, Connecticut. The following is a list of some of the notable members of Alpha Chi Rho.

Name	Chapter or club	Notability	Ref.
John Aniston	Pennsylvania State University	Actor	
Stan Bedford	Columbia University	Judge on the Supreme Court of New Jersey	
Edward Beglin	Wesleyan College	Judge on the Supreme Court of New Jersey	
Marshall Brain	Rensselaer Polytechnic Institute	Founder of HowStuffWorks.com	
R. Greer Cheeseman III	University of Pennsylvania	Director of the University of Pennsylvania Band	
Guy W. Cheney	Syracuse University	New York State Assembly	
Carlos E. Cortés	University of California, Berkeley	Emeritus professor of history at the University of California, Riverside	
Paul Trauger Culbertson Sr.	Yale University	United States Ambassador to Spain	
Alfonse D'Amato	Syracuse University	United States Senate, New York	
James Dinan	University of Pennsylvania	Founder of York Capital Management	
Edward Duncan	Cornell University	Judge, Circuit Court	
William W. Edel	Dickinson College	President Emeritus of Dickinson College	
Robert M. Hager	Dartmouth College	Correspondent, NBC News	
Carlton J. H. Hayes		United States Ambassador to Spain	
Lynn M. Jones	Thiel College	Professional baseball player, Detroit Tigers	
Patrick Kelly	Syracuse University	Professional football player, Denver Broncos	
Frank Langella	Syracuse University	Actor	
David Martin	Dartmouth College	United States House of Representatives	
Oscar G. Mayer Jr.	Cornell University	Chairman of Oscar Mayer	
Tom McCarthy	The College of New Jersey	Radio announcer for the Philadelphia Phillies	
John W. McDonald	University of Illinois	Head neurologist of the late Christopher Reeve	
Robert B. Meyner	Lafayette College	Governor of New Jersey, New Jersey Senate	
Mark A. Nordenberg	Thiel College	Chancellor of University of Pittsburgh	
William Pagonis	Pennsylvania State University	Brigadier general in the United States Army	
Jon A. Reynolds	Trinity College	Brigadier general in the United States Army	
John Ringrose	Syracuse University	Judge, State of New York	
Perry Rotella	University of Pennsylvania	CIO of Verisk Analytics	
Hugh Scott	University of Virginia	United States Senate, Pennsylvania	
Paul Siple	Allegheny College	Antarctic explorer	
Lyman H. Smith	Cornell University	Justice of the New York Supreme Court	
John C. Stennis	University of Virginia	United States Senate, Mississippi	
Rick Tuttle	Wesleyan University	16th City Controller of Los Angeles	
E. Donald Walsh	Trinity College	Adjutant General and Chief of Staff for Connecticut	
Fred Waring	Pennsylvania State University	Bandleader; inventor of the Waring Blendor	
Kenneth Webb	Columbia University	Film director, screenwriter, and composer	
Gary K. Wolf	University of Illinois	Author of Who Censored (Framed) Roger Rabbit	
