= Penn Quakers =

Intercollegiate sports teams of the University of Pennsylvania

- University: University of Pennsylvania
- Nickname: Quakers, The Red and the Blue
- NCAA: Division I (FCS)
- Conference: Ivy League (primary); EIWA (wrestling); Eastern Association of Rowing Colleges; CSA (squash)
- Athletic director: Alanna Wren
- Location: Philadelphia, Pennsylvania
- Varsity teams: 33 teams
- Football stadium: Franklin Field
- Basketball arena: Palestra
- Ice hockey arena: Class of 1923 Arena
- Baseball stadium: Meiklejohn Stadium
- Softball stadium: Penn Park
- Soccer stadium: Rhodes Field
- Aquatics center: Sheerr Pool
- Lacrosse stadium: Franklin Field
- Volleyball arena: Palestra
- Colors: Red and blue
- Mascot: The Quaker
- Fight song: "Fight on, Pennsylvania!" and "The Red and Blue"
- Website: pennathletics.com
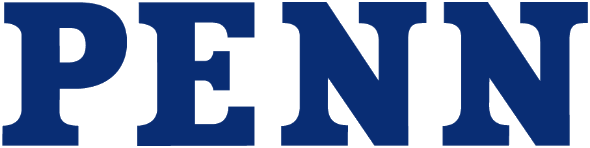

The Penn Quakers are the athletic teams of the University of Pennsylvania. The school sponsors 33 varsity sports and 36 intercollegiate club sports. . The school has won three NCAA national championships in men's fencing and one in women's fencing.

== Sponsored teams ==
Men's sports	Women's sports
Baseball	Basketball
Basketball	Cross country
Cross country	Fencing
Fencing	Field hockey
Football	Golf
Sprint football	Gymnastics
Golf	Lacrosse
Lacrosse	Rowing
Rowing	Soccer
Soccer	Softball
Squash	Squash
Swimming and diving	Swimming and diving
Tennis	Tennis
Track and field	Track and field
Wrestling	Volleyball

== Origins ==
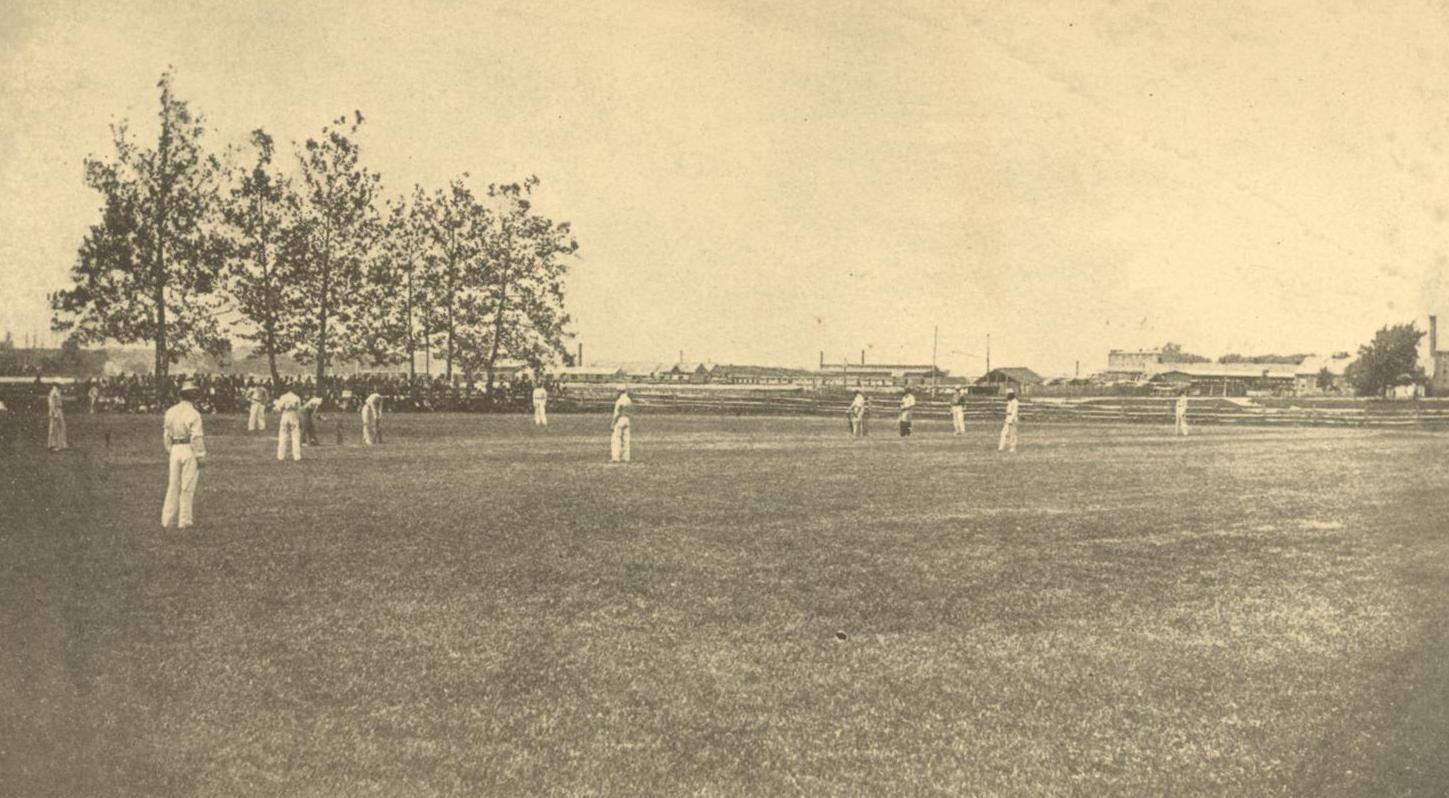
Photo of Penn's cricket team, which was (other than a footrace in the 1760s) the earliest organized athletic activity extant in Penn archives

The first athletic team at Penn was the cricket team, which formed in 1842 and played regularly through 1846, the year it lost its "grounds", and then only played intermittently until 1864, the year it played its first intercollegiate game (against Haverford College). The rowing (or crew) team composed of Penn students but not officially representing Penn was formed in 1854 but did not compete against other colleges as official part of Penn until 1879. The rugby football team began to play against other colleges, most notably against College of New Jersey (now Princeton University) in 1874 using a combination of association football (i.e. soccer) and rugby rules (the twenty players on each side were able to use their hands but were not able to pass or bat the ball forward).

== Men's varsity sports ==
=== Baseball ===
Mark DeRosa played varsity baseball for the Penn Quakers from 1994 to 1996.

=== Men's basketball ===
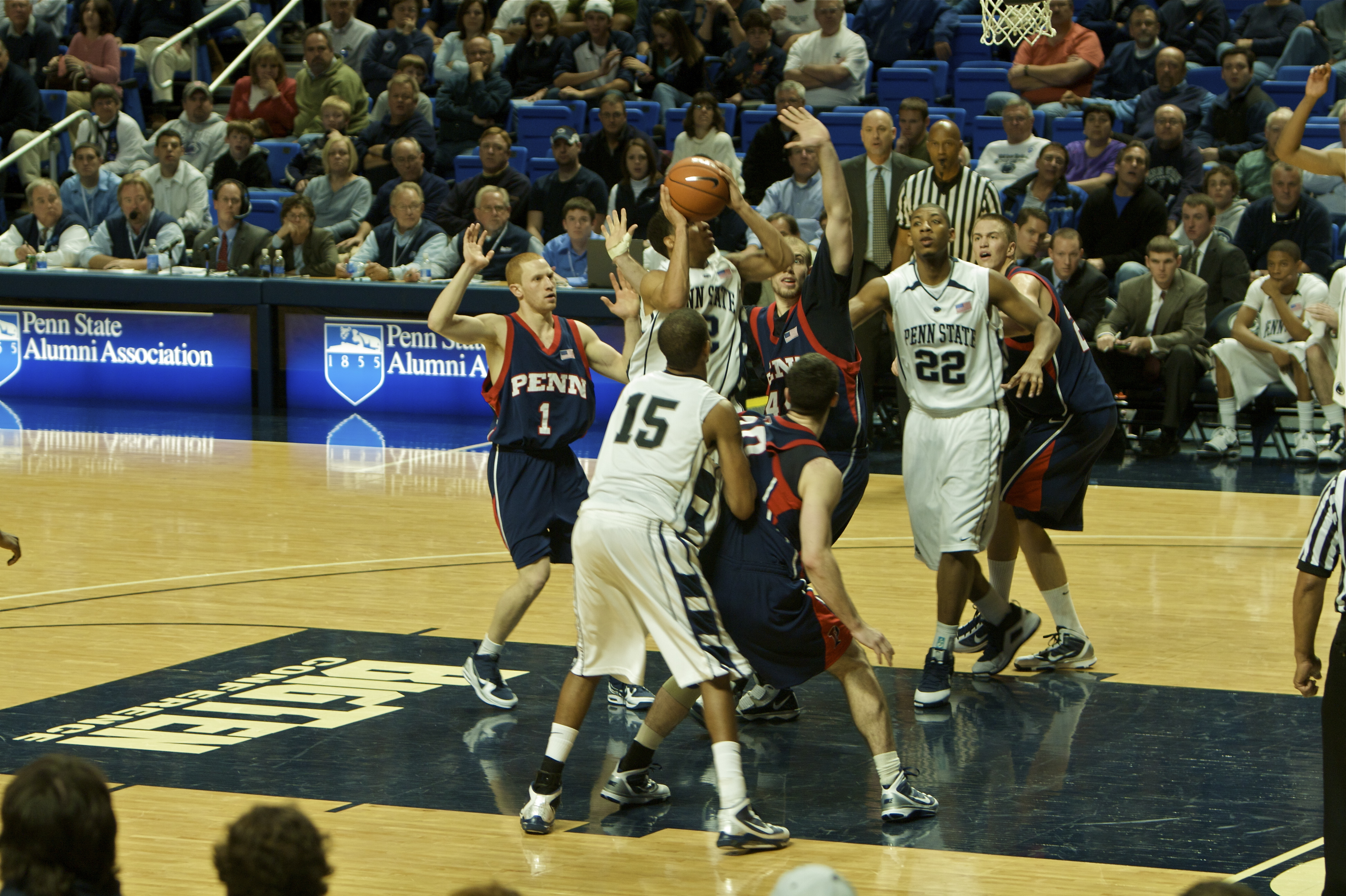
Penn v Penn State game in 2009

Penn has appeared in one Final Four, in 1979. Penn and Princeton are tied for the most Ivy League regular season championships with 26 each. Their main Ivy League rivalry is with Princeton, whom they used to always play as the last regular season game. Combining the EIL and Ivy Championships Penn leads with 39 championships; Princeton 32; Columbia 14; Yale 13; Dartmouth 12; Cornell 8; Harvard 6; and Brown 1.

One of Penn's most memorable seasons came in 1978–79 when the Quakers advanced to the NCAA tournament Final Four. Player Tony Price led the Quakers, who stunned the nation with victories over Iona, North Carolina, Syracuse, and St. John's to advance to the Final Four. The Quakers faced Earvin "Magic" Johnson and Michigan State in the national semifinals in Salt Lake City, Utah, but were met with defeat, 101–67. They are the last Ivy League team to advance to the Final Four and Elite Eight of the NCAA tournament as of 2023.

=== Men's crew ===
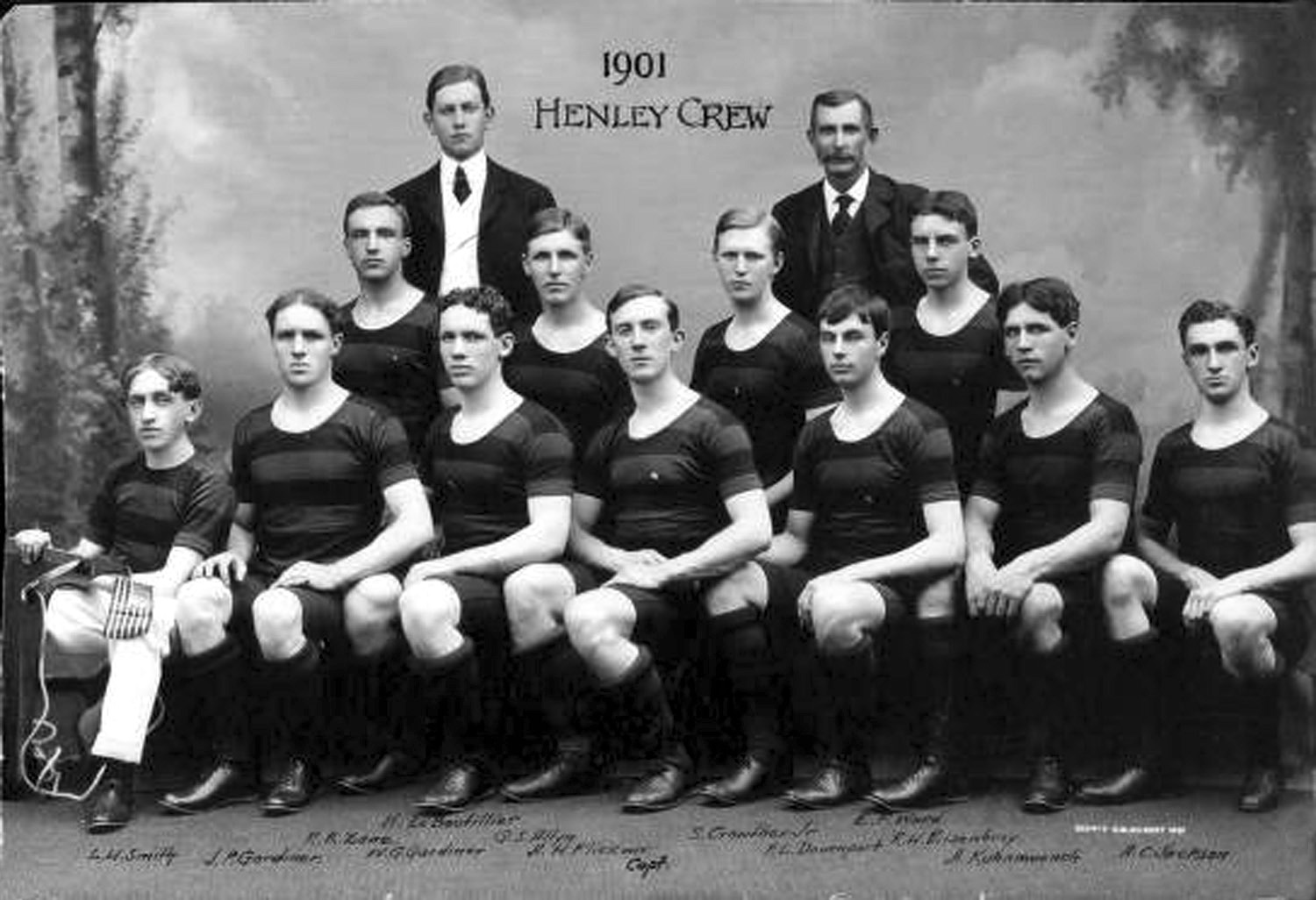
Penn's eight oared crew – 1901 – first “foreign” crew to reach the final of the Grand Challenge Cup at Henley Royal Regatta

Crew at Penn dates back to at least 1854 with the founding of the University Barge Club. The university currently hosts both heavyweight and lightweight men's teams, which compete as part of the Eastern Sprints League. Ellis Ward was Penn's first intercollegiate crew coach from 1879 through 1912. During course of Ward's coaching career at Penn his "... Red and Blue crews won 65 races, in about 150 starts." Importantly, Ward coached Penn's 8 oared boat to the finals of the Grand Challenge Cup (the oldest and most prized trophy) at the Henley Royal Regatta (but in that final race was defeated by the champion Leander Club).

Penn Rowing has produced a long list of famous coaches and Olympians. Members of Penn crew team, rowers Sidney Jellinek, Eddie Mitchell, and coxswain, John G. Kennedy won the bronze medal for the United States at 1924 Olympics. Joseph William Burk (Penn Class of 1935), captain of Penn Crew team and winner of the Henley Diamond Sculls twice, was named recipient of the James E. Sullivan Award for nation's best amateur athlete. The outbreak of World War Two canceled the 1940 Olympics for which he was favored to win the Gold Medal. Other Olympic athletes and or coaches of such athletes include John B. Kelly Jr., Joe Burk, Rusty Callow, Harry Parker and Ted Nash. In 1955, the Penn men's heavyweight crew became one of only four American university crews to win the Grand Challenge Cup at the Henley Royal Regatta. The Penn teams presently row out of College Boat Club, No.11 Boathouse Row.

Other Penn Olympic athletes and or Penn coaches of such athletes include: (a) John Anthony Pescatore (who competed in the 1988 Seoul Olympic Games for the United States as stroke of the men's coxed eight which earned a bronze medal and later competed at the 1992 Barcelona Olympic Games in the men's coxless pair), (b) Susan Francia (winner of gold medals as part of the women's 8 oared boat at 2008 Olympics and 2012 Olympics), (c) Regina Salmons (member of 2021 USA team), (d) Rusty Callow, (e) Harry Parker, (f) Ted Nash, and (g) John B. Kelly Jr., son of John B. Kelly Sr. (winner of three medals at 1920 Summer Olympics) and brother of Princess Grace of Monaco, was the second Penn Crew alumnus to win the James E. Sullivan Award for being nation's best amateur athlete (in 1947), who was winner of a bronze medal at the 1956 Summer Olympics).

Penn men's crew team won the National Collegiate Rowing Championship in 1991. A member of that team, Janusz Hooker (Wharton School class of 1992) won the bronze medal in Men's Quadruple Sculls for Australia at the 1996 Summer Olympics. The Penn teams presently row out of College Boat Club, No. 11 Boathouse Row.

=== Football ===
The football team has competed since 1876. It has won eighteen national championships when the school competed in what is now known as the FBS. Since the formation of the Ivy League in 1956, Penn has won 17 Ivy League Football Championships.(1959, 1982, 1983, 1984, 1985, 1986, 1988, 1993, 1994, 1998, 2000, 2002, 2003, 2009, 2010, 2012, 2015). Penn has been outright Ivy Football Champion 13 times and been undefeated 8 times. Eighteen former players have been inducted into the College Football Hall of Fame.

In addition to the varsity squad, the Penn Quakers are a charter member of the Collegiate Sprint Football League, having played the sport since 1934.

=== Men's soccer ===
Before the NCAA began its tournament in 1959, the annual national champion was declared by the Intercollegiate Association Football League (IAFL) — from 1911 to 1926 — and then the Intercollegiate Soccer Football Association (ISFA), from 1927 to 1958. From 1911 to 1958, Penn won ten national championships.

=== Men's squash ===
The University of Pennsylvania features one of the fastest rising men's squash programs in the nation, reaching new heights in 2020 by finishing as national runners up. The feat marked the first such occasion in program history.

=== Men's swimming ===
The Penn men's swimming team was founded in 1894. They have won the Ivy League championships five times: in 1940; 1964–65; 1967–68; 1969–70; and 1970–71. Penn's swim team practices and competes at Sheerr Pool in the Pottruck fitness facility.

=== Wrestling ===
Penn Quaker wrestling dates back to 1905, where the first intercollegiate wrestling championship was held in Weightman Hall Gym located on campus. Princeton, Yale and Columbia joined Penn in founding the Eastern Intercollegiate Wrestling Association (EIWA). The wrestling team competes in the Palestra arena.

== Women's varsity sports ==
=== Women's basketball ===
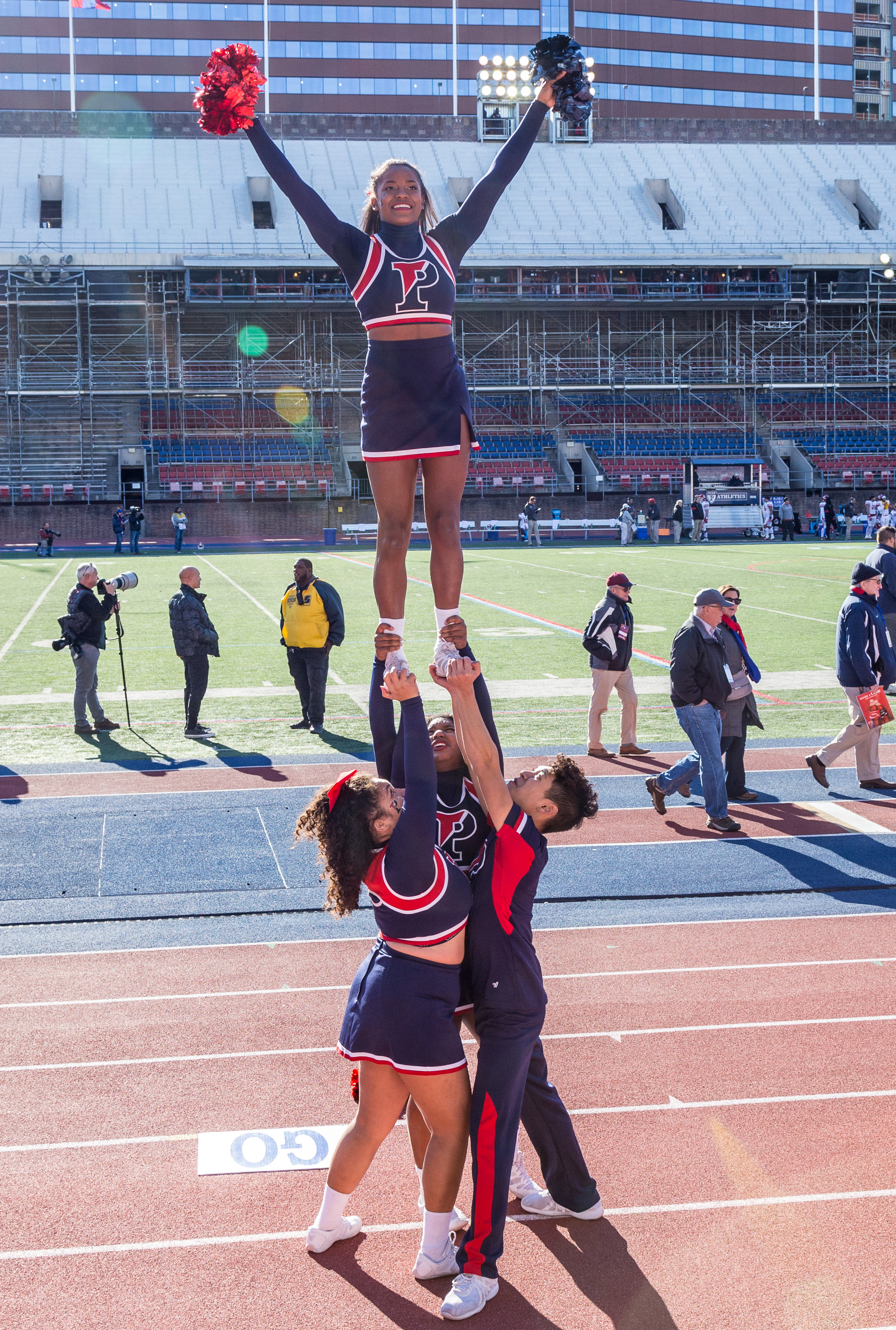
Penn cheerleaders

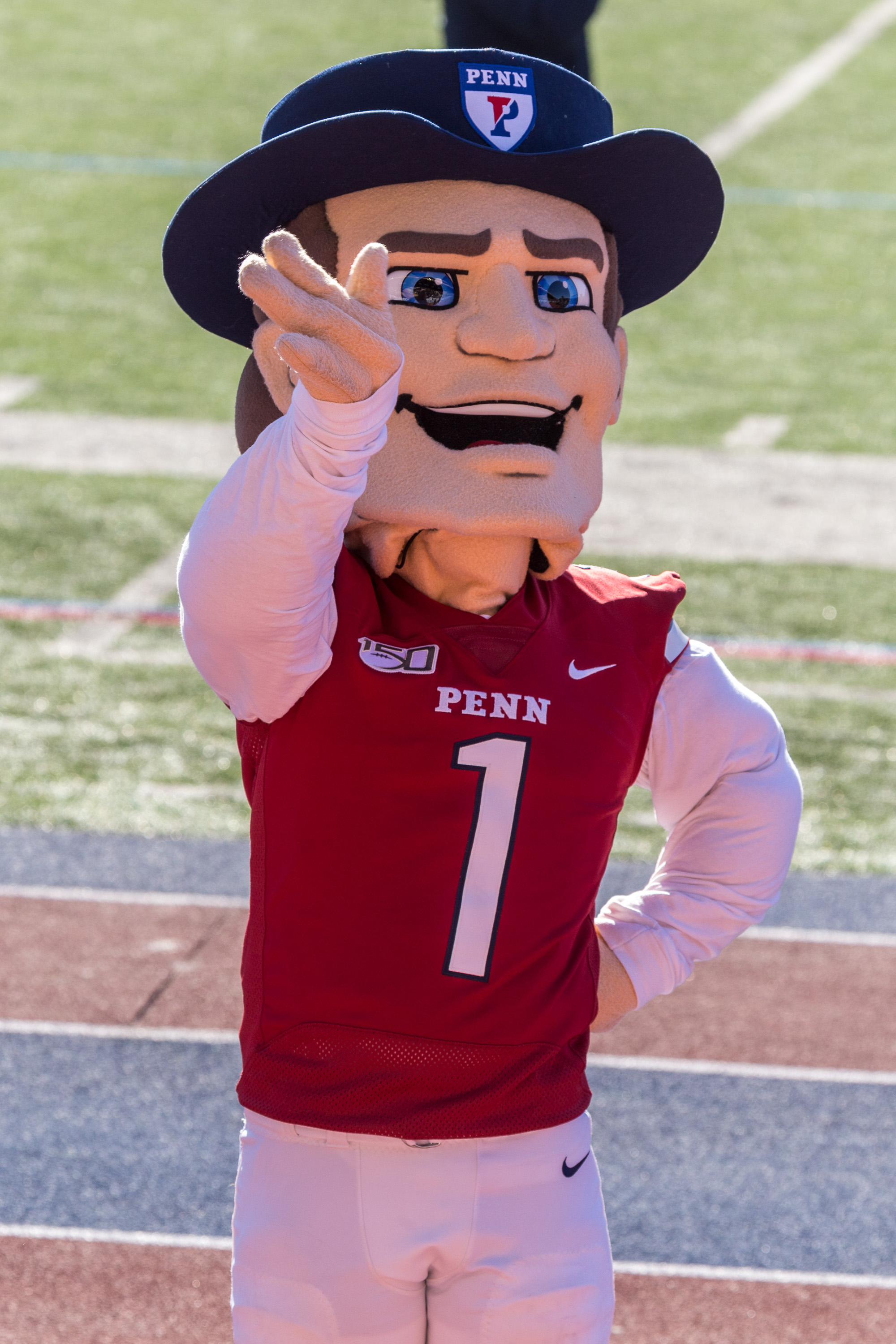
The Quaker mascot

Penn has won the Ivy League title in 2001, 2004, 2014, 2016, and 2017.

== Club sports ==
=== Cricket ===
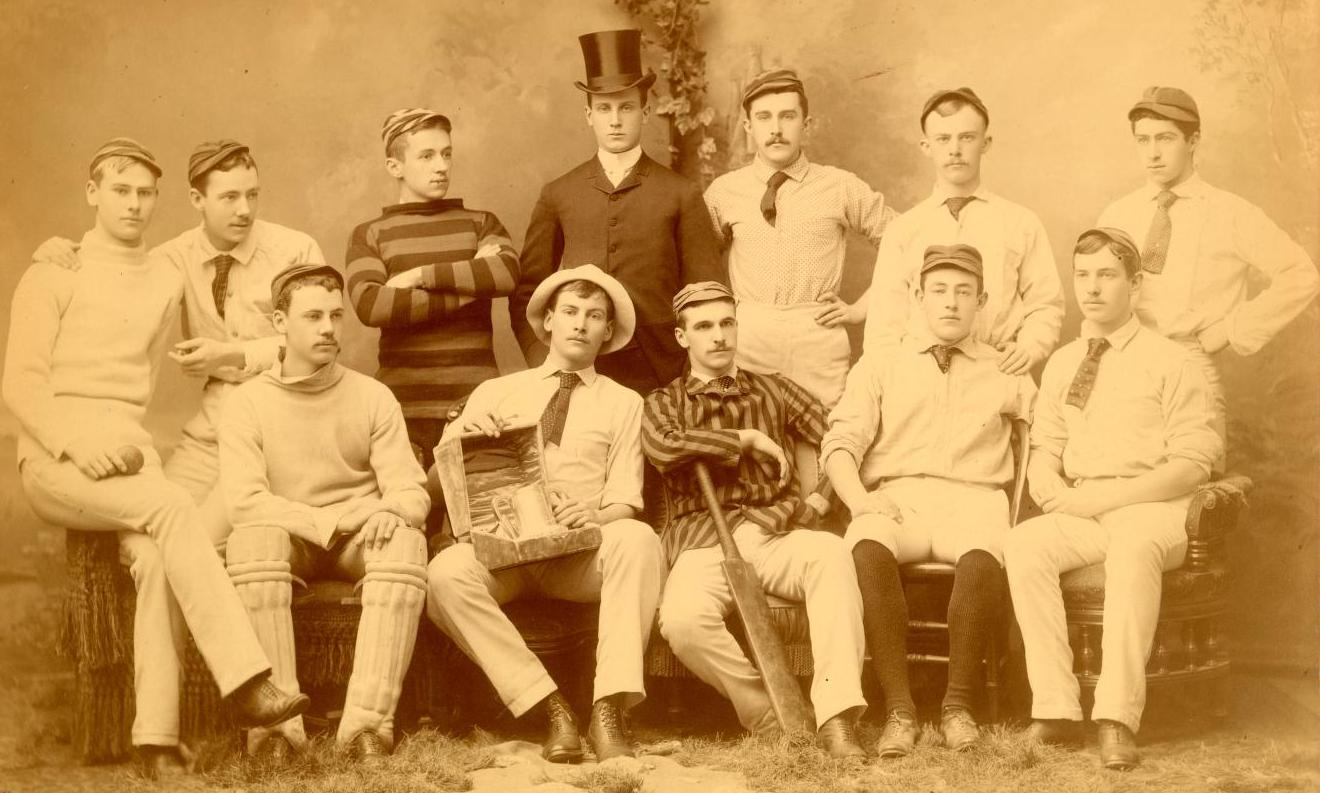
Penn's 1887 Cricket Team, which won the Intercollegiate Cricket Association, the de facto national championship, displaying the trophy granted to winner (held in front row by person wearing white hat)

The first University of Pennsylvania cricket team, reported to be the first cricket team in the United States composed exclusively of Americans, was organized in 1842. On May 7, 1864, Penn played its first intercollegiate game against Haverford College (the 3rd oldest intercollegiate athletic contest after Harvard Yale 1852 crew race and Amherst Williams 1859 Baseball game). After Penn moved west of the Schuylkill River in 1872, Penn played cricket at one of the local clubs, Belmont Cricket Club, Merion Cricket Club, Germantown Cricket Club, or at Haverford College. Beginning in 1875 and through 1880, Penn fielded a varsity eleven, which played a few matches each year against opponents that included Haverford College and Columbia College. In 1881, Penn, Harvard College, Haverford College, Princeton College (then known as College of New Jersey), and Columbia College formed the Intercollegiate Cricket Association, which Cornell University later joined. Penn won The Intercollegiate Cricket Association championship, the de facto national championship, 23 times (18 solo, three shared with Haverford and Harvard, one shared with Haverford and Cornell, and one shared with just Haverford) during the 44 years that The Intercollegiate Cricket Association existed from 1881 through 1924. (Note: Haverford won such championships nineteen times: three shared with Penn and Harvard, one shared with Penn and Cornell, and one shared with Penn. In third place, Harvard won it six times, none after 1899, three of these shared with Haverford and Penn.) In the 1890s, Penn's cricket team frequently toured Canada and the British Isles. Perhaps the university's most famous cricket player was George Patterson (class of 1888), who still holds the North American batting record and who went on to play for the professional Philadelphia Cricket Team. Following the World War I, cricket began to experience a serious decline, such that in 1924 Penn fielded its last team in the twentieth century. Starting in 2009, however, Penn once again fielded a cricket team, albeit club, that ended up being the first winner of a tournament for teams from the Ivies.

=== Curling ===
University of Pennsylvania Curling Club qualified for the 2023 National Championship at 6th place, the same ranking they qualified for the 2022 National Championship (where they finished in 2nd place), but in 2023 the team won the national championship by defeating arch rival Princeton University in the championship match (6 to 3). Penn Curling is the only East Coast team to have won the Curling National Championship.

=== Rugby ===
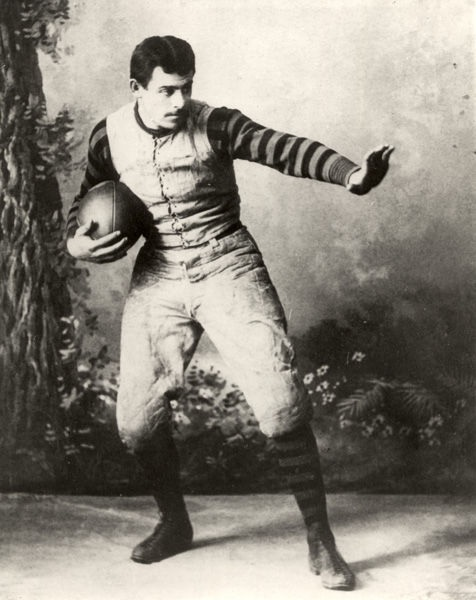
John Heisman, a University of Pennsylvania Law School class of 1892 alumnus and rugby football player, posing at Penn in 1891 holding an elongated ellipsoidal rugby ball and gestures resembling the famed "Heisman Pose" associated with the Heisman Trophy, named in his honor

The Penn men's rugby football team is one of the oldest collegiate rugby teams in the United States. Penn first fielded a team in mid-1870s playing by rules much closer to the rugby union and association football code rules relative to American football rules (as such American football rules had not yet been invented). Among its earliest games was a game against the College of New Jersey, which became Princeton in 1895, played in Philadelphia on Saturday, November 11, 1876, which was less than two weeks before Princeton met on November 23, 1876, with Harvard and Columbia to confirm that all their games would be played using the rugby union rules. Princeton and Penn played their November 1876 game per a combination of rugby (there were 20 players per side and players were able to touch the ball with their hands) and Association football codes. The rugby code influence was due, in part, to the fact that some of their students had been educated in English public schools.

Among the prominent alumni to play in a 19th-century version of rugby in which rules then did not allow forward passes or center snaps was John Heisman, namesake of the Heisman Trophy and an 1892 graduate of the University of Pennsylvania Law School. Heisman was instrumental in the first decade of the 20th century in changing the rules to more closely relate to the present rules of American football. One of Heisman's teammates (who was unanimously voted Captain in the fall after Heisman graduated) was Harry Arista Mackey, Penn Law class of 1893 (who subsequently served as Mayor of Philadelphia from 1928 to 1932). In 1906, Rugby per Rugby Union code was reintroduced to Penn (as Penn last played per Rugby Union Code in 1882 as Penn played rugby per a number of different rugby football rulebooks and codes from 1883 through 1890s) by Frank Villeneuve Nicholson (Penn Dental School (class of 1910)), who in 1904 had captained the Australian national rugby team in its match against England.

Penn played per rugby union code rules at least through 1912, contemporaneously with Penn playing American gridiron football. Evidence of such may be found in an October 22, 1910, Daily Pennsylvanian article (quoted below) and a yearbook photo that rugby per rugby union code was played.

Such is the devotion to English rugby football on the part of University of Pennsylvania's students from New Zealand, Australia, and England that they meet on Franklin Field at 7 o'clock every morning and practice the game. The varsity track and football squads monopolize the field to such an extent that the early hours of the morning are the only ones during which the rugby enthusiasts can play. Any time except Friday, Saturday and Sunday, a squad of 25 men may be seen running through the hardest kind of practice after which they may divide into two teams and play a hard game. Once a week, captain CC Walton, ('11), dental, who hails from New Zealand, gives the enthusiastic players a blackboard talk in which he explains the intricacies of the game in detail.

The player-coach of United States Olympic gold-winning rugby team at the 1924 Summer Olympics was Alan Valentine, who played rugby while at Penn (which he attended during 1921/1922 academic year) as he was getting a master's degree at Wharton. Though Penn played rugby per rugby union rules from 1929 through 1934, there is no indication that Penn had a rugby team from 1935 through 1959 when Penn men's rugby became permanent due to leadership of Harry "Joe" Edwin Reagan III Penn's College class of 1962 and Penn Law class of 1965, who also went onto help create and incorporate (in 1975) and was Treasurer (in 1981) of USA Rugby and Oreste P. "Rusty" D'Arconte Penn's College class of 1966.

In spring of 1984, Penn women's rugby, led by Social Chair Tamara Wayland (College class of 1985, who subsequently became the women's representative to and vice president of USA Rugby South from 1996 to 1998); club president Marianne Seligson; and Penn Law student Gigi Sohn, began to compete.

Penn women's rugby team is coached, as of 2020, by (a) Adam Dick, a 300-level certified coach with over 15 years of rugby coaching experience including being the first coach of the first women's rugby team at the University of Arizona and who was a four-year starter at University of Arizona men's first XV rugby team and (b) Philly women's player Kate Hallinan.

As of 2020, Penn men's rugby team is coached by Tiger Bax, a former professional rugby player hailing from Cape Town, South Africa, whose playing experience includes stints in the Super Rugby competition with the Stormers (15s) and Mighty Mohicans (7s), as well as with the Gallagher Premiership Rugby side, Saracens and whose coaching experience includes three successful years as coach at Valley Rugby Football Club in Hong Kong; and Tyler May, from Cherry Hill, New Jersey, who played rugby at Pennsylvania State University where he was a first XV player for three years.

Penn's graduate business and law schools also fielded rugby teams. The Wharton rugby team has competed from 1978 to the present. The Penn Law Rugby team (1985 through 1993) counts among its alumni Walter Joseph Jay Clayton, III Penn Law class of 1993, and chair of the U.S. Securities and Exchange Commission from May 4, 2017, until December 23, 2020, Raymond Hulser, former Chief of Public Integrity Section of United States Department of Justice (who also was hired by DOJ special counsel Jack Smith to investigate the alleged mishandling by former President Donald J. Trump of certain top secret documents), and Magistrate Judge Bruce Reinhart who approved the search of Mar-a-Lago, the residence of current U.S. president Donald Trump in Palm Beach, Florida.

Undergraduate Penn Rugby Alumni include (1) Conor Lamb (Penn College class of 2006 and Penn Law class of 2009), who played for undergraduate team, and, as of 2021, is a member of United States House of Representatives, elected originally to Pennsylvania's 18th congressional district, since 2019 is a former U.S. representative from Pennsylvania's 17th congressional district and (2) Argentina's richest person, Marcos Galperin (Wharton Undergraduate Class of 1994), a premier player on the 1992 Ivy League Tournament championship team, who founded Mercado Libre, an online marketplace dedicated to e-commerce and online auction, which, as of 2016, is the most popular e-commerce site in South America by number of visitors.

== Championships ==
=== NCAA team championships ===
Penn has 4 NCAA team national championships.

- Men's (3)
  - Fencing (3): 1953, 1969, 1981
- Women's (1)
  - Fencing (1): 1986
- See also:
  - Ivy League NCAA team championships
  - List of NCAA schools with the most NCAA Division I championships

== See also ==
- Olympic Boycott Games (1980) – held at the University of Pennsylvania
- Penn Relays
- "The Red and Blue"
- Philadelphia Sports Hall of Fame
- Sports in Philadelphia § Collegiate sports
- National Collegiate Athletic Association § Football television controversy

== School colors ==
University of Pennsylvania Blue

Color coordinates
- Hex triplet: #011F5B
- sRGB^{B} (r, g, b): (1, 31, 91)
- HSV (h, s, v): (220°, 99%, 36%)
- CIELCh_{uv} (L, C, h): (14, 37, 260°)
- Source: Penn branding guidelines
- ISCC–NBS descriptor: Deep blue
- B: Normalized to [0–255] (byte)

University of Pennsylvania Red

Color coordinates
- Hex triplet: #990000
- sRGB^{B} (r, g, b): (153, 0, 0)
- HSV (h, s, v): (0°, 100%, 60%)
- CIELCh_{uv} (L, C, h): (31, 105, 12°)
- Source: Penn branding guidelines
- ISCC–NBS descriptor: Deep red-maroon
- B: Normalized to [0–255] (byte)

There are several legends relating how "The Red and Blue" came to be used by the University of Pennsylvania. Whether they are fact or fiction remains unknown.

1. Harvard and Yale. In the early days of the university there was a race among the students of Harvard, Yale, and the University of Pennsylvania. The Harvard team wore their famous crimson; Yale teams wore their traditional Yale blue. When the Penn participants were asked which colors would represent their team, they replied that they would be wearing the colors of the two teams they would soon beat. The Penn athletes won the race, and Penn teams used those colors from then on.
2. George Washington's Clothing. It is rumored that George Washington visited the university during one of his terms as President of the United States. He is supposed to have arrived wearing a blue jacket and breeches with a red waistcoat. The next day, the students decked the university in these colors and donned red and blue themselves to honor the president. Afterward, it was decided to use these colors by the university.
3. Penn's and Franklin's Coats of Arms. When the university was creating a seal and coat of arms it decided to use elements from both Benjamin Franklin's and William Penn's coats-of-arms—Franklin had helped to found the university, and Penn had founded the Commonwealth of Pennsylvania. Franklin's coat of arms contained the color red and Penn's featured a blue chevron.

As University Archivist Francis James Dallett pointed out in 1983: "Eighteenth-century American academic institutions simply did not have colors." This leaves one inclined to relegate the above explanations to the realm of local myth.

A resolution adopted by the university trustees on May 17, 1910, states: "The colors shall be red and blue,...The colors [of the University of Pennsylvania] shall conform to the present standards used by the United States Government in its flags." Thus it is possible to determine when Penn adopted the colors red and blue, at least officially.
