= Penn Quakers football =

College football team

2026 Penn Quakers football team
- First season: 1876; 150 years ago
- Head coach: Ricky Santos; 1st season, 0–0 (–)
- Location: Philadelphia, Pennsylvania, U.S.
- Stadium: Franklin Field (capacity: 52,593)
- NCAA division: Division I FCS
- Conference: Ivy League
- Colors: Red and blue
- All-time record: 888–523–42 (.626)
- Bowl record: 0–1–0 (.000)

National championships
- Claimed: 1894, 1895, 1897, 1904, 1907, 1908, 1924

Conference championships
- Ivy League: 1959, 1982, 1983, 1984, 1985, 1986, 1988, 1993, 1994, 1998, 2000, 2002, 2003, 2009, 2010, 2012, 2015, 2016
- Consensus All-Americans: 63
- Rivalries: Cornell (rivalry); Harvard (rivalry); Princeton (rivalry)

Uniforms
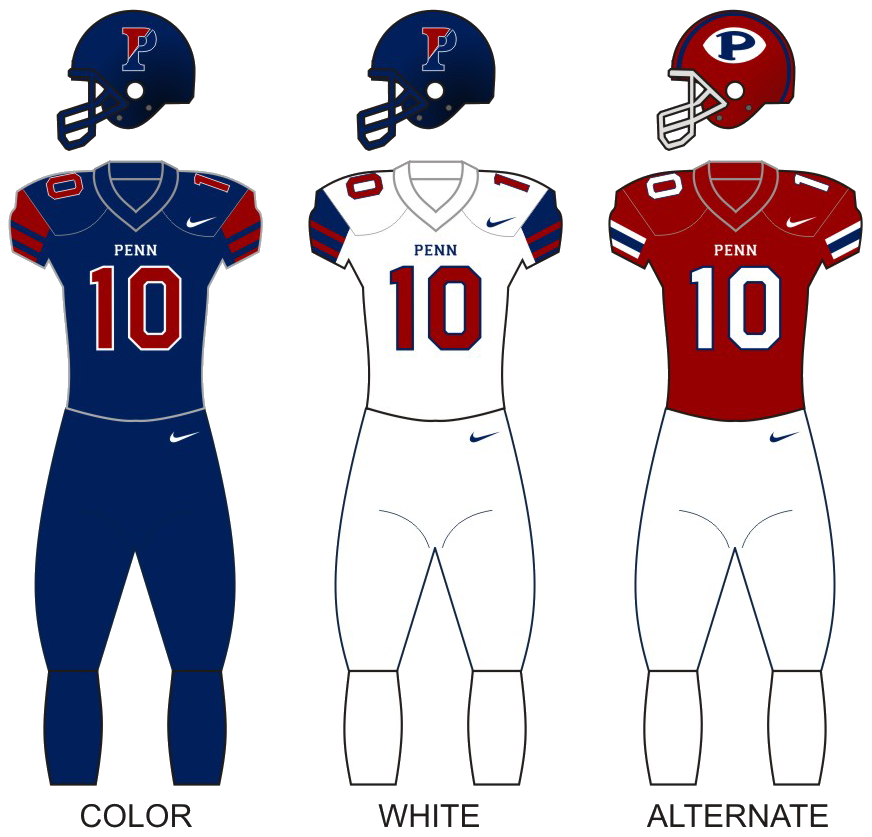
- Fight song: Fight on, Pennsylvania!
- Mascot: The Penn Quaker
- Marching band: The University of Pennsylvania Band
- Website: PennAthletics.com

The Penn Quakers football program is the college football team at the University of Pennsylvania in Philadelphia. The Penn Quakers have competed in the Ivy League since its inaugural season of 1956, and are a Division I Football Championship Subdivision (FCS) member of the National Collegiate Athletic Association (NCAA). Penn's first game was in 1876, and the team has played in 1,413 football games, the most of any school in any division. Penn plays its home games at historic Franklin Field, the oldest football stadium in the nation. All Penn games are broadcast on WNTP or WFIL radio.

== Overall history ==
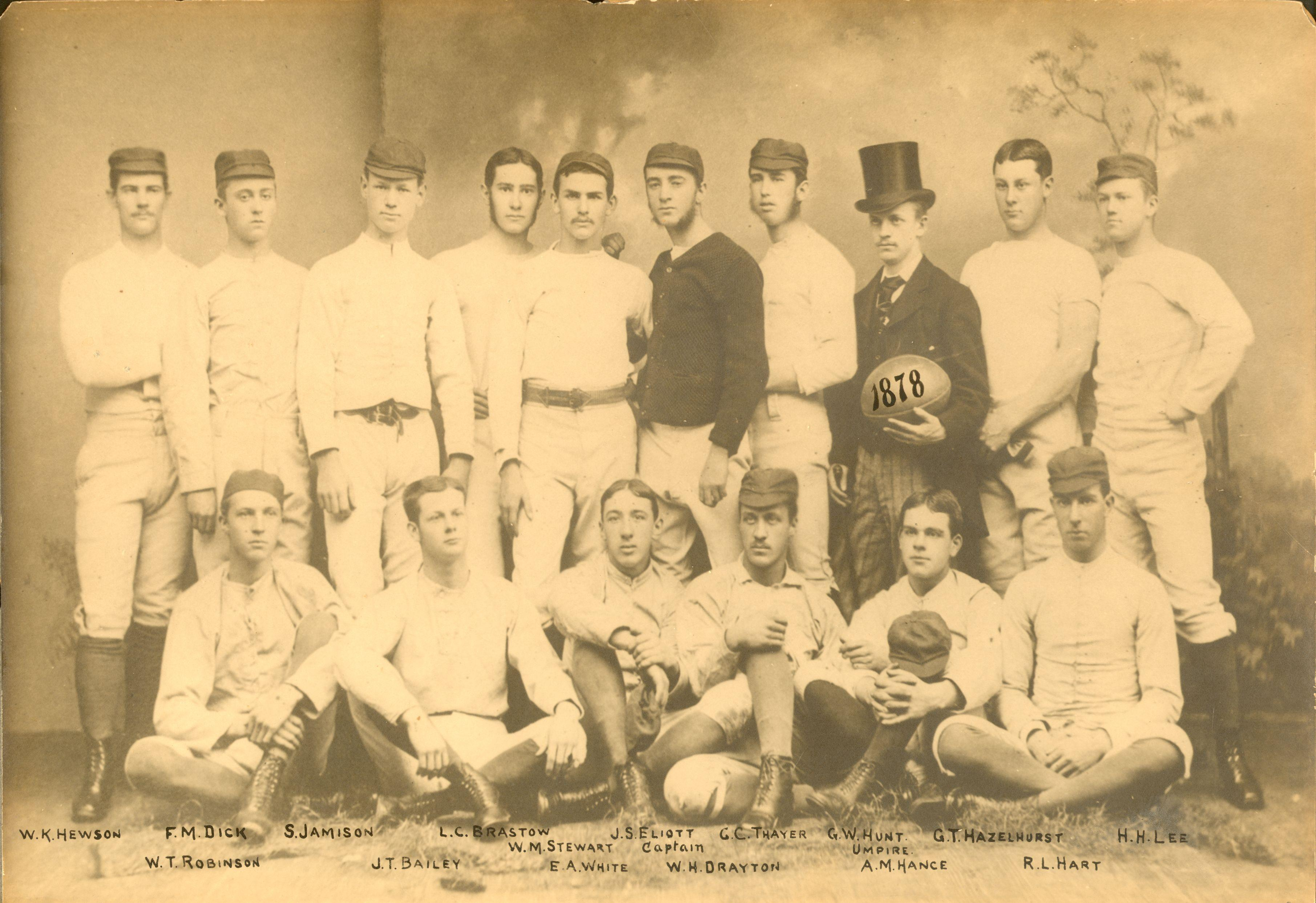
One of the first teams of the university, 1878

Penn bills itself as "college football's most historic program". The Quakers have had 63 First Team All-Americans, and the college is the alma mater of John Heisman (the namesake of college football's most famous trophy). The team has won a share of 7 national championships (7th all-time) and competed in the "granddaddy of them all" (The Rose Bowl) in 1917. Penn's total of 837 wins puts them 11th all-time in college football (3rd in the FCS) and their winning percentage of 62.9% is 21st in college football (7th in the FCS). 18 members of the College Football Hall of Fame played at Penn (tied with Alabama for 14th) and 5 members of the College Football Hall of Fame coached at Penn. Penn has had 11 unbeaten seasons. Penn plays at the oldest stadium in college football, Franklin Field, at which they have had a 35-game home winning streak (1896–1899), which is the 15th best in the country, and at which they have had 23 unbeaten home seasons. Penn is one of the few college football teams to have had an exclusive contract with a network for broadcasting all their home games. For the 1950 season, ABC Sports broadcast all of Penn's home games. The only other teams to have had exclusive contracts are Miami and Notre Dame. The Quakers competed as a major independent until 1956, when they accepted the invitation to join the Ivy League. When the Ivy League was reclassified to Division I-AA, today known as FCS, following the 1981 season, Penn moved to Division I-AA play with the rest of the league.

Before the start of the 2020 season, the Ivy League announced that no sports would be played until January 1, 2021, at the earliest, because of the COVID-19 pandemic. The League resumed in September 2021.

=== NCAA television controversy ===
In 1951, the NCAA attempted to stop any live broadcast of college football games during the season, which affected Penn due to them being one of only two colleges to enact this practice (the other being Notre Dame). After public outcry, the NCAA restricted the number of games televised for each team. Penn attempted to circumvent the rules through its contract, but they had to back down due to the NCAA's threat of possibly expelling the Quakers from the association.

== Ivy League ==
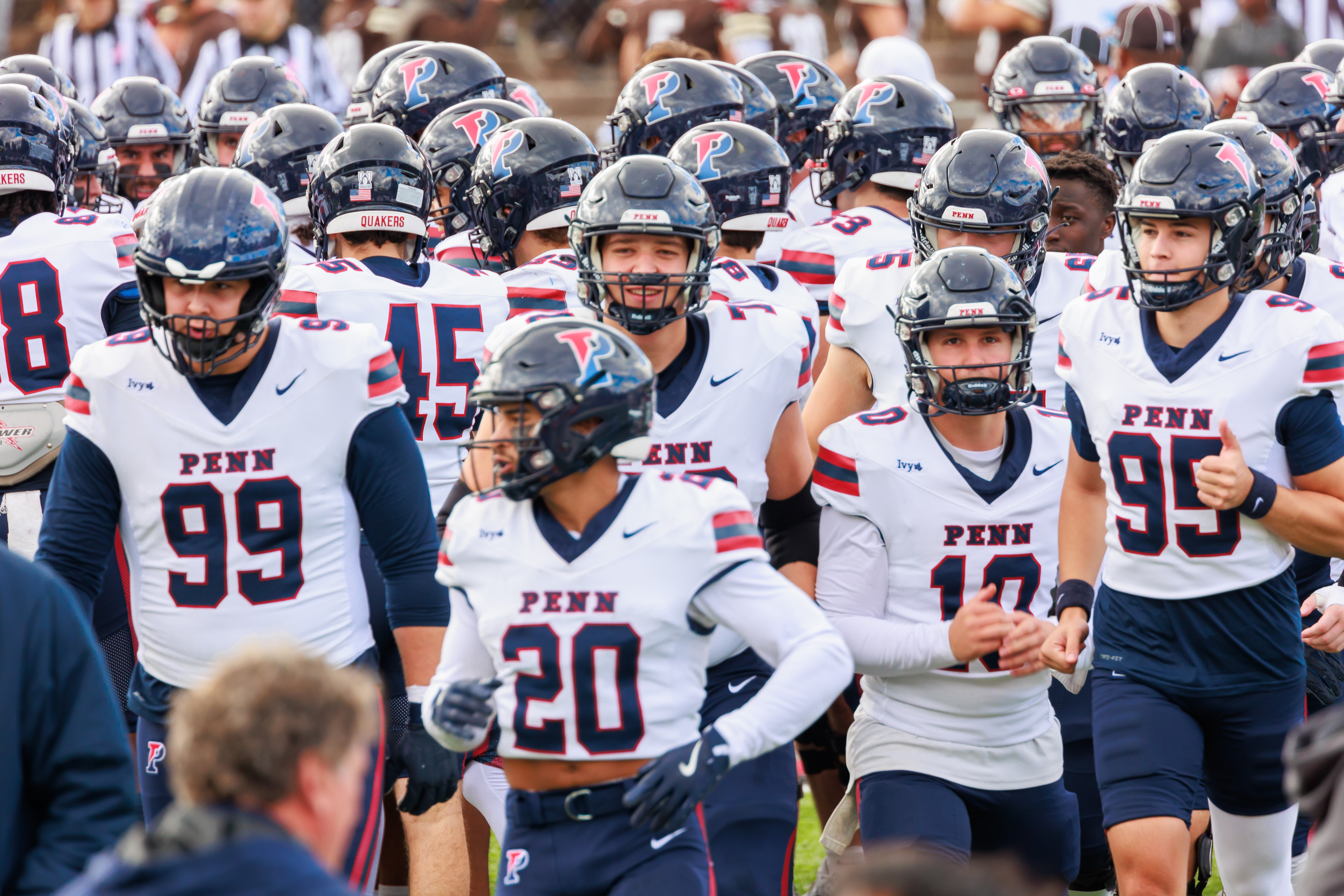
Penn Quakers in 2024

Penn joined the Ivy League in 1956 when it was formed. Penn won its first Ivy League Football Championship in 1959. It was not until 1982, 23 years later, that Penn would win its second Ivy League Football Championship. Since that year Penn has become a dominant football power in the Ivy League. They are tied with Dartmouth in winning a record 18 Ivy League Football Championships. Penn, however, is first in outright Ivy League titles (13), and first in undefeated Ivy League titles (8).

== Championships ==
=== National championships ===
Penn has been named national champions seven times by NCAA major selectors, and claims all seven championships.

The Billingsley Report named the 1907 Quakers national champions under Billingsley's original formula. Updated Billingsley rankings no longer name Penn national champions in 1907, but Penn continues to claim the championship.

Year	Selector	Coach	Record
1894	Parke H. Davis	George Woodruff	12–0
1895	Billingsley, Helms Athletic Foundation, Houlgate System, National Championship Foundation, Parke Davis	George Woodruff	14–0
1897	Billingsley, Helms Athletic Foundation, Houlgate, National Championship Foundation, Parke Davis	George Woodruff	15–0
1904	Helms Athletic Foundation, Houlgate, Parke Davis, National Championship Foundation	Carl "Cap" Williams	12–0
1907	Billingsley Report (1995-1999 formula)	Carl "Cap" Williams	11–1
1908	Helms Athletic Foundation, Houlgate System, Parke Davis, National Championship Foundation	Sol Metzger	11–0–1
1924	Parke Davis	Lou Young	9–1–1

=== Conference championships ===
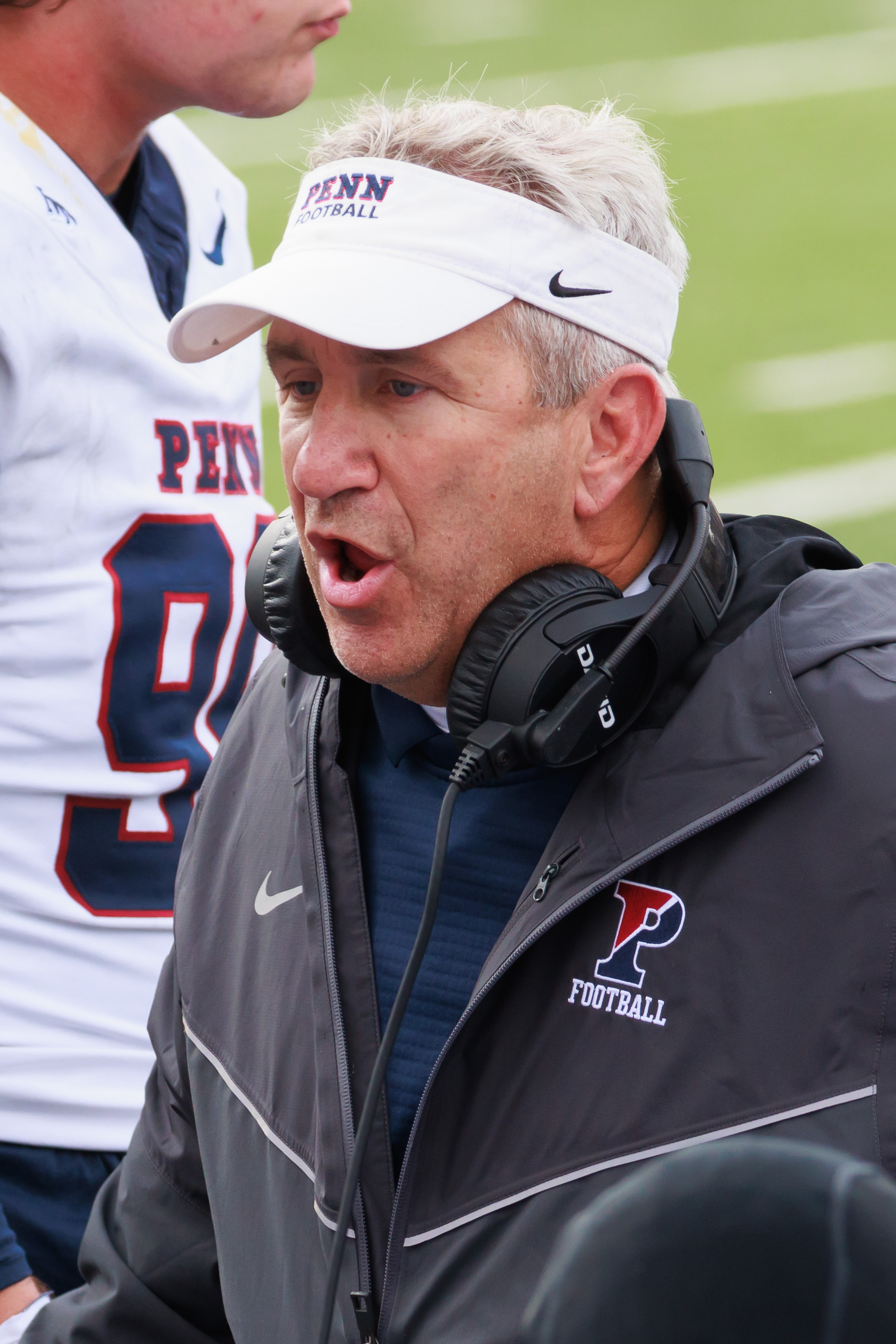
Head coach Ray Priore

Penn has won 18 conference championships (all of which in the Ivy League), winning 13 outright and five shared.

Year	Conference	Coach	Overall record	Conference record
1959	Ivy League	Steve Sebo	7–1–1	6–1
1982†	Ivy League	Jerry Berndt	7–3	5–2
1983†	Ivy League	Jerry Berndt	6–3–1	5–1–1
1984	Ivy League	Jerry Berndt	8–1	7–0
1985	Ivy League	Jerry Berndt	7–2–1	6–1
1986	Ivy League	Ed Zubrow	10–0	7–0
1988†	Ivy League	Ed Zubrow	9–1	6–1
1993	Ivy League	Al Bagnoli	10–0	7–0
1994	Ivy League	Al Bagnoli	9–0	7–0
1998	Ivy League	Al Bagnoli	8–2	6–1
2000	Ivy League	Al Bagnoli	7–3	6–1
2002	Ivy League	Al Bagnoli	9–1	7–0
2003	Ivy League	Al Bagnoli	10–0	7–0
2009	Ivy League	Al Bagnoli	8–2	7–0
2010	Ivy League	Al Bagnoli	9–1	7–0
2012	Ivy League	Al Bagnoli	6–4	6–1
2015†	Ivy League	Ray Priore	7–3	6–1
2016†	Ivy League	Ray Priore	7–3	6–1

† Co-champions

== NCAA records ==
NCAA record for most college football games played – 1,413.
NCAA record for consecutive overtime losses – 3 games

== Ivy League records ==
Most outright Ivy League titles – 13 (1959, 1984, 1985, 1986, 1993, 1994, 1998, 2000, 2002, 2003, 2009, 2010, 2012);
Highest number of unbeaten Ivy League seasons – 8 (1984, 1986, 1993, 1994, 2002, 2003, 2009, 2010);
Longest Ivy League winning streak – 20 straight games (2001–2004). Penn also holds the next two longest Ivy League win streaks: 18 straight games (2008–2011) and 17 straight games (1992–1995).
Record 18 Ivy League Football Championships. Tied with Dartmouth.

== Franklin Field ==
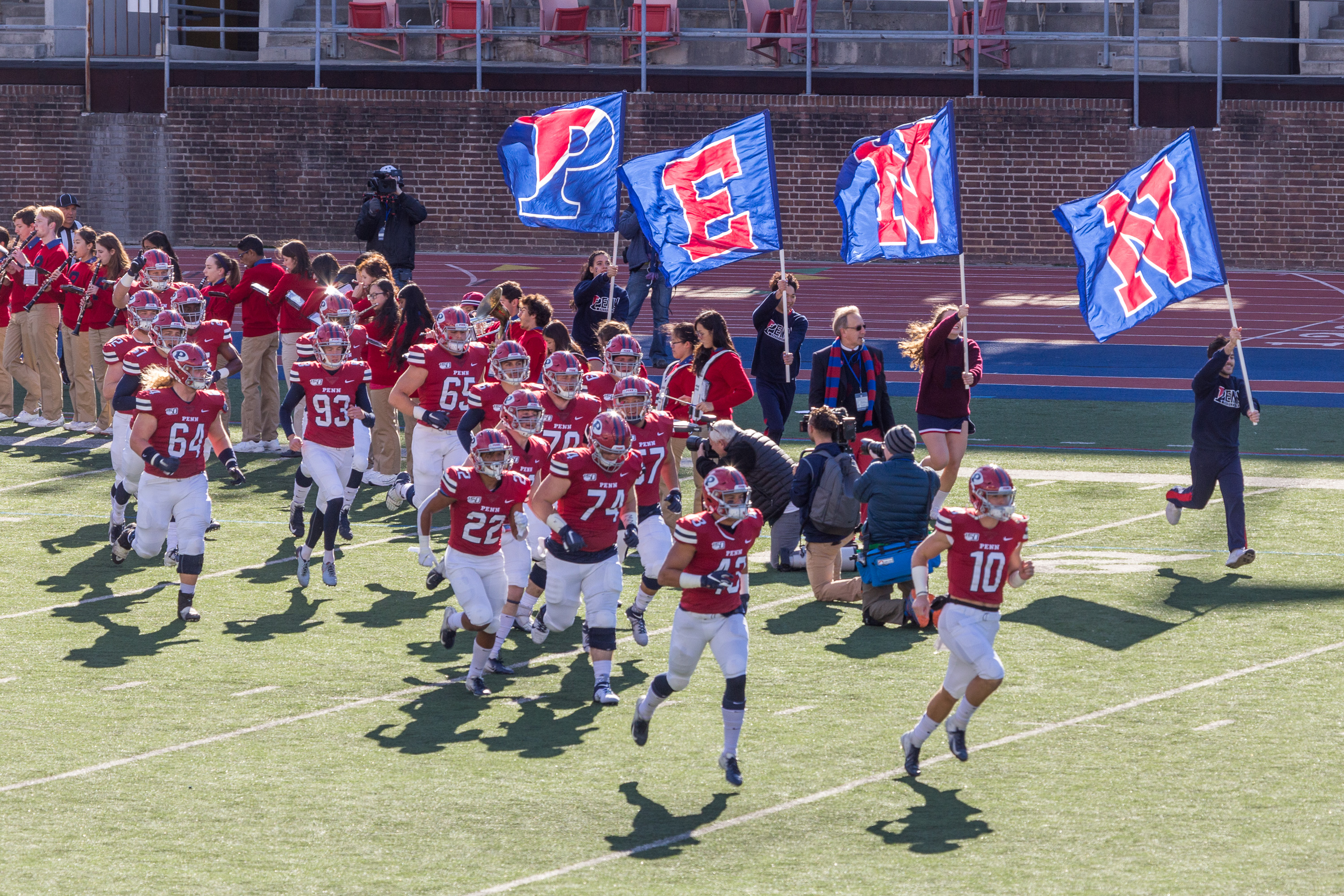
Quakers enter Franklin Field in 2019

Penn's home stadium Franklin Field is not only the oldest stadium in football but holds many other records as well. It is the site of the oldest stadium scoreboard (1895), the "original horseshoe" (1903), the first college football radio broadcast (1922 on WIP), the first double-decker football stadium (1925), the largest stadium in the country (1925–1926), the first college football television broadcast (1940 on KYW-TV) and the first FCS stadium to host ESPN's College Gameday (2002).

== Penn in the AP Poll ==
Year	Final ranking
1936	10
1940	14
1941	15
1943	20
1945	8
1946	13
1947	7

== Bowl games ==
Penn has participated in one bowl game, garnering a record of 0–1.

Season	Coach	Bowl	Opponent	Result
1916	Bob Folwell	Rose Bowl	Oregon	L 0–14

== Rivalries ==
=== Cornell ===
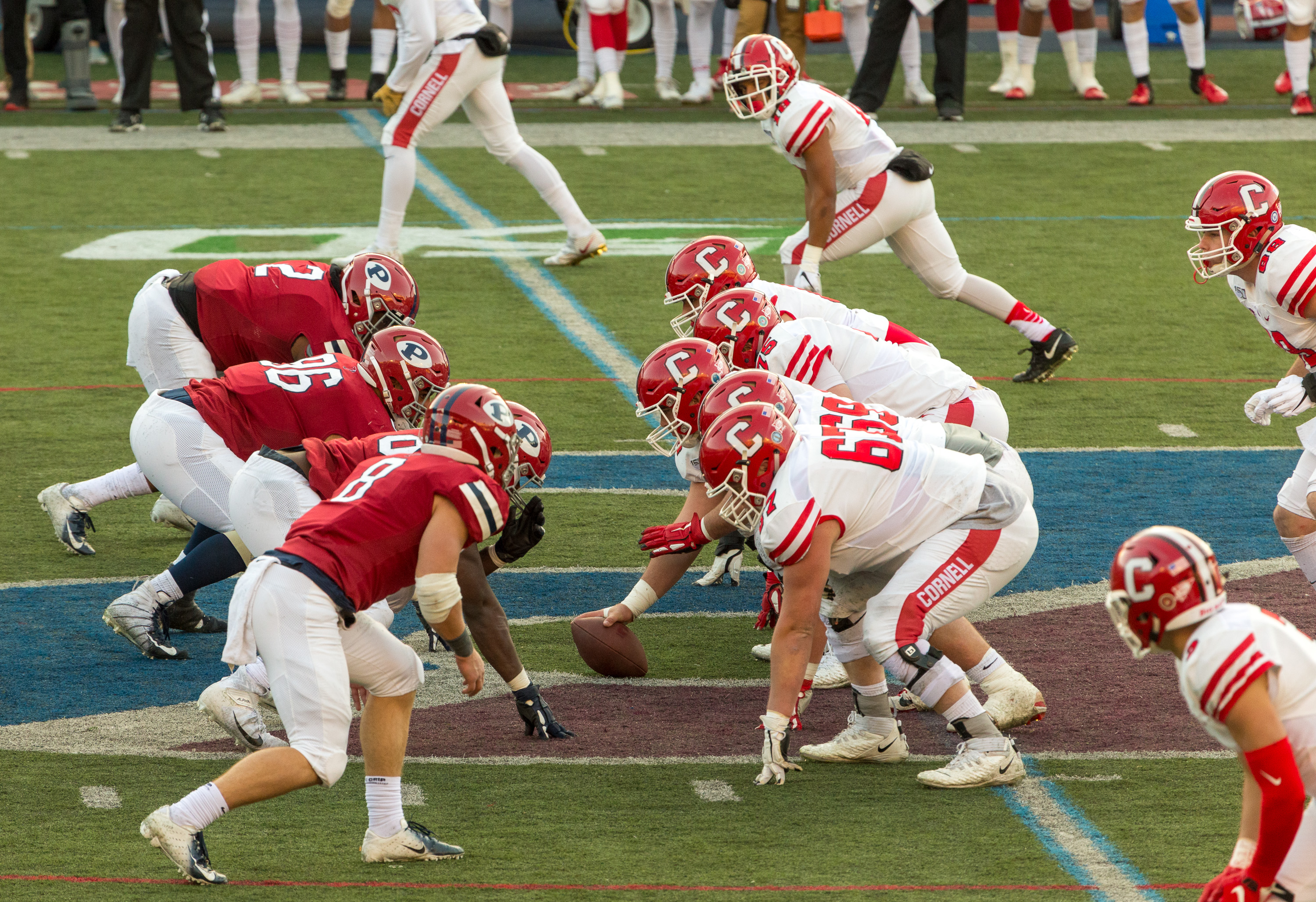
Penn/Cornell game, 2019

The series with Cornell dates to 1893. Penn leads the series 73–46–5 through the 2017 season.

=== Harvard ===
The series with Harvard dates to 1881. Harvard leads the series 48–38–2 through the 2017 season.

=== Princeton ===
The series with Princeton dates to 1876. Princeton leads the series 66–42–1 through the 2017 season.

== Individual players ==
=== Notable Quaker players ===
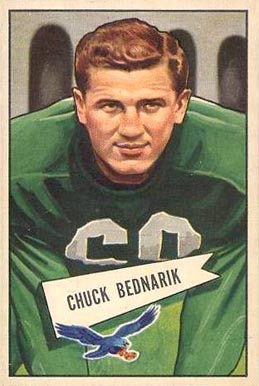
Chuck Bednarik (aka "Concrete Charlie") played gridiron football at the University of Pennsylvania where he was a '60-minute man', excelling as a center on offense and linebacker on defense, was a three-time All-American gridiron football player, and was elected a member of the College Football Hall of Fame, drafted as number 1 pick in 1st round of 1949 NFL Draft by Philadelphia Eagles

- Reds Bagnell – 1950 Maxwell Award winner, All-American, runner up for the Heisman Trophy, College Football Hall of Fame
- Chuck Bednarik – namesake of the Chuck Bednarik Award, 1948 Maxwell Award winner, Pro Football Hall of Fame, College Football Hall of Fame
- Bert Bell – former NFL commissioner, founder, owner & coach of the Philadelphia Eagles, owner of the Pittsburgh Steelers, Pro Football Hall of Fame
- George H. Brooke – Twice All-America, College football Hall of Fame.
- Truxton Hare – Consensus All-American every year he played, College Football Hall of Fame, winner of silver medal in the hammer throw at the 1900 Summer Olympics
- Jim Finn – 1999, New York Giants starting full back in Super Bowl XLII
- John Heisman – namesake of the Heisman Trophy, College Football Hall of Fame
- Florian Kempf – Professional soccer player and NFL kicker for the Houston Oilers and New Orleans Saints
- Alden Knipe – All-America, led team to 1894 national championship.
- Leroy Mercer- All-America, College Football Hall of Fame, Olympic athlete
- Skip Minisi – first-round NFL draft pick, College Football Hall of Fame
- Bob Odell – 1943 Maxwell Award winner, College Football Hall of Fame
- John H. Outland – namesake of the Outland Trophy, College Football Hall of Fame
- George Savitsky – All-American tackle in the 1940s, only four-year All American of the 20th century in College Football, in the College Football Hall of Fame, drafted by Philadelphia Eagles.
- Kevin Stefanski – Head coach of the Cleveland Browns
- Justin Watson – wide receiver for the Kansas City Chiefs, a three-time Super Bowl champion.

=== Individual award winners ===
Penn's total of three major award winners surpasses several BCS programs to this day.

- Maxwell Award

Bob Odell – 1943
Chuck Bednarik – 1948
Reds Bagnell – 1950

- Ivy League Coach of the Year

Jerry Berndt – 1984
Ray Priore – 2015

=== College Football Hall of Fame ===
Eighteen former players have been inducted into the College Football Hall of Fame.

=== Quakers in the NFL draft ===
A total of 51 players from Penn have been drafted in the NFL including NFL Hall of Famers Chuck Bednarik (#1 overall pick in 1949) and NFL first-round pick Skip Minisi.

== Notable games ==
=== Penn 30, Navy 26 ===
On October 18, 1986, Penn defeated Navy 30–26 in front of Navy's Homecoming crowd. Penn finished the season undefeated at 10–0, 7–0 in the Ivy League for their 5th straight Ivy League title.

=== Penn 35, Harvard 25 ===
On November 14, 2015, Penn defeated 12th ranked Harvard 35–25 at Harvard Stadium. This win ended Harvard's 22-game winning streak; their first loss since October 26, 2013. With this win, Penn improved to 6–3, 5–1 in the Ivy League, and with a 34–21 win in their next and final game against Cornell, were able to clinch a share of the Ivy League title along with Harvard and Dartmouth. The title capped a remarkable comeback season for Penn. After back-to-back losing seasons in 2013 and 2014, Penn started the 2015 season at 1–3, including a loss in their Ivy League opener, but rallied with 6 straight wins to end the season.

=== Penn 27, Harvard 14 ===
On November 11, 2016, Penn defeated 22nd ranked Harvard at Franklin Field. This win ended Harvard's Ivy record 13-game Ivy road game win streak. With this win, Penn improved to 6–3, 5–1 in the Ivy League, and into a three-way tie atop the Ivy League alongside Harvard and Princeton. Penn scored two touchdowns in the game's final 17 seconds, headlined by an 80-yard touchdown drive engineered by quarterback Alek Torgersen and a last second scoop and score by Tayler Hendrickson. A 42–20 victory the next week against Cornell gave Penn a share of the 2016 Ivy League title, making them back-to-back champions for the first time since 2009–2010. A Harvard loss to Yale in "The Game" the next week dropped the Crimson out of title contention.

=== Penn 23, Harvard 21 ===
On November 13, 1982, Penn defeated Harvard with no time left on the game clock at Franklin Field. This win clinched a share of the Ivy football title for Penn. While Penn led 20–0 with nine minutes to play, Harvard scored three touchdowns in just eight minutes. However, the Quarterback Gary Vura, starting at his own 20-yard line with just a minute and 24 seconds left, marched his team down the field, setting up a field goal attempt by kicker Dave Shulman. Shulman's 38-yard attempt was tipped by a Harvard player and went wide left. But Harvard was called for roughing the kicker. Since a game cannot end on a potential decision-changing defensive penalty, Shulman kicked again, this time from the 11-yard line and his 27-yard field goal was good. Although the Quakers did lose the following weekend to Cornell, their victory that day, after three losing seasons of 0–9, 1–9 and 1–9, gave Penn a share of the Ivy title for the first time since 1959, which had been its only Ivy title. It also marked the turning point in Penn's Ivy football play, with the Quakers winning or sharing another 16 Ivy titles during the 35 years since then.

== Future non-conference opponents ==
Announced schedules as of March 5, 2026.

2026
at Bucknell
Lehigh
Howard
