= University of Pennsylvania Band =

US college marching band

The University of Pennsylvania Band
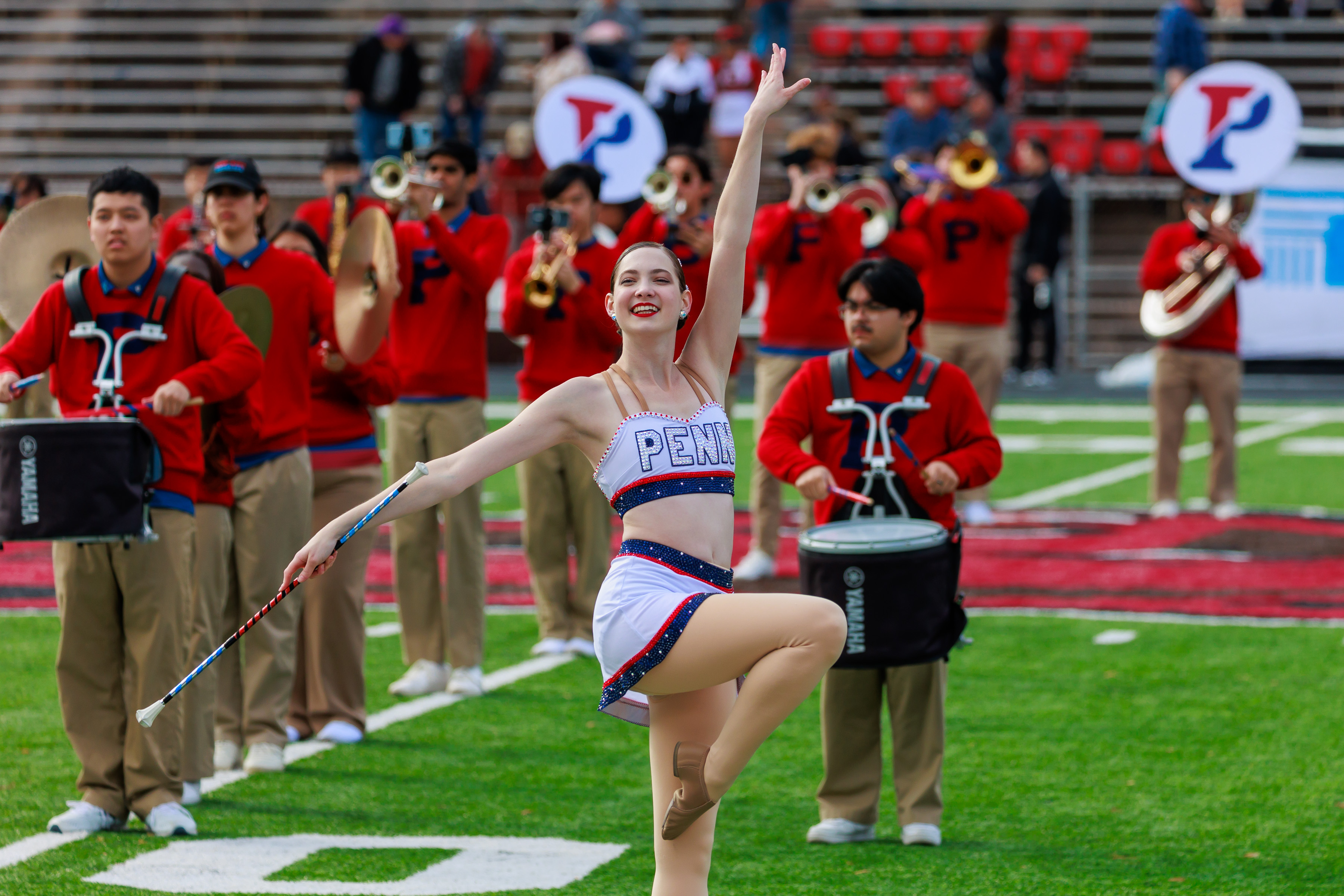
- Performing in 2024
- School: University of Pennsylvania
- Location: Philadelphia, Pennsylvania, U.S.
- Conference: Ivy League
- Founded: 1897
- Director: R. Greer Cheeseman III
- Members: 107
- Fight song: "The Red and Blue," "Fight On, Pennsylvania!," "Cheer Pennsylvania!," "Drink a Highball"
- Website: The Penn Band

The Penn Band logo

The University of Pennsylvania Band (commonly known as the Penn Band, or its vaudeville-esque performance name The Huge, the Enormous, the Well-Endowed, Undefeated, Ivy-League Champion, University of Pennsylvania Oxymoronic Fighting Quaker Marching Band) is among the most active collegiate band programs in the U.S. The organization is a part of Student Life and the Department of Athletics at the University of Pennsylvania, a private Ivy League school in Philadelphia.

Like most of the other near-60 performing arts groups on the Penn Campus, it has no affiliation with any academic department. Typically ranging between 80 and 120 members every year, it is among the largest and most active student-run organizations on campus, assembling up to ~100 times between August and May. Like most of the Ivy League bands, the Penn Band is a scramble band.

== History ==
=== 19th century ===
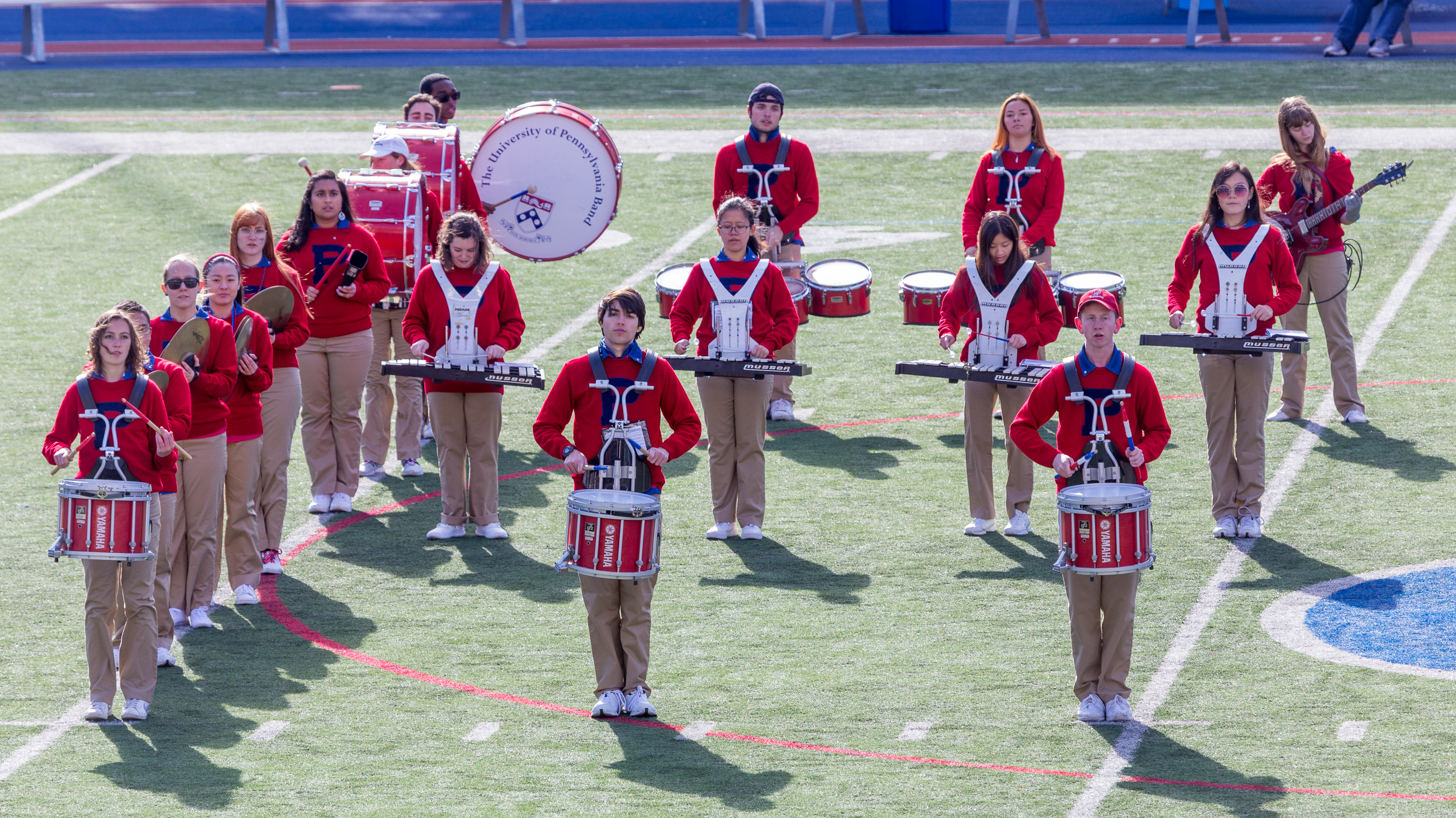
The band in 2019 on Franklin Field in Philadelphia

Founded in 1897, the Penn Band stands among the oldest college bands in the country. In 1901, it also became one of the nation's first traveling bands. According to popular legend, the band began after a single cornet player named A. Felix DuPont played to the jeers of residents in the student quadrangle ("Shut up, fresh!"). A more understanding upperclassman, John Ammon, helped DuPont gather 27 volunteers who formed the school's first band.

Its history is marked with a sustained record of performance and achievement. In its first year, the Band performed twice for President William McKinley, as well as at the opening of Houston Hall, the country's first student union. The organization later became an integral part of Penn sporting events—one of the first college bands to play regularly at sporting events. It has been a staple at historic Franklin Field and the Palestra, campus traditions such as Convocation, ‘Hey Day,’ and Commencement ceremonies, and performances across The Greater Philadelphia Region.

=== 20th century ===
Appearances during the 20th century include countless NCAA tournament games (including The NCAA Final Four in 1979), the Macy's Thanksgiving Day Parade, one of the first collegiate marching bands to ever march in the parade, the 1964 New York World's Fair, and the Miss America Pageant Parade on more than one occasion.

During its history, the organization has performed with notable musicians, including John Philip Sousa, Edwin Franko Goldman, members of the Philadelphia Orchestra, the U.S. Marine Band ("The President's Own"), Doc Severinsen of The Tonight Show Starring Johnny Carson, and the prominent composer Václav Nelhýbel. The band's performances also include national broadcasts and numerous recordings, beginning in the late 1920s and 1930s with the Victor Talking Machine Company (RCA-Victor Company) and nationally broadcast performances on WABC. In popular culture, Chuck Barris of Gong Show fame performed with the Band in 1977, and the Band opened for the Maury Povich Show in 1980.

The group has performed at the pleasure of many dignitaries and celebrities over its history in the context of celebrations on-campus and in Philadelphia. This list includes Governor Ed Rendell, Vice President Al Gore, Grace Kelly, President Ronald Reagan, Bill Cosby, Lech Wałęsa, President Theodore Roosevelt, President Lyndon B. Johnson, Peter Lynch, Dolly Parton, Dan Aykroyd, Chris Matthews, and Rudy Giuliani.

By the late 1960s, along with most of the other Ivy League bands, the Penn Band became a scramble band. It had already began moving away from the traditional corps style in the 1960s. Its trademark football uniform of the past ~45 years, the large P sweater, is an inadvertent nod to the past — it is a near-exact copy of the uniform worn by the freshman band in the early 1930s.

=== 21st century ===
The first hundred years of the organization's history was detailed in a book,Images of America:The University of Pennsylvania Band, published in 2006 by Arcadia Publishing.

The 2015-2016 band

The Penn Band performs at campus events and traditions, all Football games, and nearly all Men's and Women's Basketball games. The group also tours along the East Coast. The group's appearances include NCAA tournament games since the 1970s, ESPN Game Day Live, MSNBC Hardball, and the Fox and Friends Morning Show. In 2007, the band had the opportunity to perform with rock drummer Simon Kirke on the Penn campus. In December 2008, the Band appeared on a nationally televised sports special on CBS Sports, and in April 2008, the Band performed for Bill Clinton and Hillary Clinton at an election rally on the Penn campus.

== Color guard ==
The Penn Band included a color guard section from 2007 to 2010, which performed alongside band members. After a decade without an official color guard, the section was reintroduced in January 2021. The Cornell Big Red Marching Band was the only other Ivy League university to have an official color guard until Harvard introduced one in Fall 2025.

== Notable alumni ==
- Lucien Cailliet, former member of the Philadelphia Orchestra and arranger of the Penn fight songs for marching band
- Greer Cheeseman, current band director and originator of toast-throwing tradition
- James DePreist, Class of 1957
- A. Felix du Pont, businessperson, philanthropist, and a co-founder of the Penn Band
- Billy Goeckel, first baseman for the Philadelphia Phillies, composer of "The Red and Blue", and co-founder of the Penn Band
- Allan Jaffe, tubist and founder, Preservation Hall
- Elliot Lawrence, Class of 1944
- Bruce Montgomery, longtime Penn Glee Club Director and former Director of the Band (1957–1958)
- Roland F. Seitz, bandmaster and composer of "The University of Pennsylvania Band March"
- Ted Weems, Class of 1944

== Traditions ==
- Script Penn – At Homecoming, the Band and Band Alumni form a script PENN on the field during the halftime show
- Toast-throwing – At every home Penn football game, during the singing of "Drink a Highball" after the third quarter, fans throw a piece of toast onto the field while the band plays the lyrics 'here's a toast to dear old Penn.' This was started by the band's current director, Greer Cheeseman, in a reference to The Rocky Horror Picture Show.
- Alumni Day and Commencement – The Band leads the parade of alumni and graduates during these springtime festivities.*

== Songs ==
- Hail, Pennsylvania! (The Alma Mater)
- The Red and Blue
- The Field Cry of Penn ("Hang Jeff Davis")
- Cheer Pennsylvania!
- Drink a Highball
- Fight on, Pennsylvania!
- Men of Pennsylvania
- The University of Pennsylvania Band March
  - In 1901, the renowned bandmaster Roland F. Seitz (1867–1946) of Glen Rock, Pennsylvania wrote the famous University of Pennsylvania Band March. The march is generally regarded as one of the finest compositions ever written for a student band, and ultimately was adapted by many other organizations throughout the country.
- Franklin Field March
  - Edwin Franko Goldman, generally regarded only second to John Philip Sousa in the early 20th century, composed the Franklin Field march for the University of Pennsylvania Band. On November 5, 1932, Goldman's Franklin Field March was performed for the first time at the annual University of Pittsburgh-University of Pennsylvania football game.

== Discography (known) ==
- The University of Pennsylvania Band (RCA Victor #20040, 1926)
- Songs of Pennsylvania (Marquis Recordings MR-107, MR-108, MR-109, MR-110, 1950)
- The Songs of the University of Pennsylvania (with Penn Glee Club, RCA, 1955)
- The University of Pennsylvania Symphonic Band (1963)
- Sports Marches: The University of Pennsylvania Band and the All-American Band (SESAC, 1965)
- Cheer Pennsylvania! (1983)
- Penn Band: World Tour (1986)
- Live at Smoke's (1989)
- A Toast to Dear Old Penn (1993)
- Five Score and Several Years to Go (1997)
- The Band That Rocks the Cradle (2001)
- The Band Before Time (2007)
- Where in the World is the Penn Band? (2012)
- The Band in Space (2016)
- The Penn Band Breaks...The Internet! (2020)
