= Palestra =

Arena and gymnasium in Philadelphia, Pennsylvania

The Palestra
- The Cathedral of College Basketball
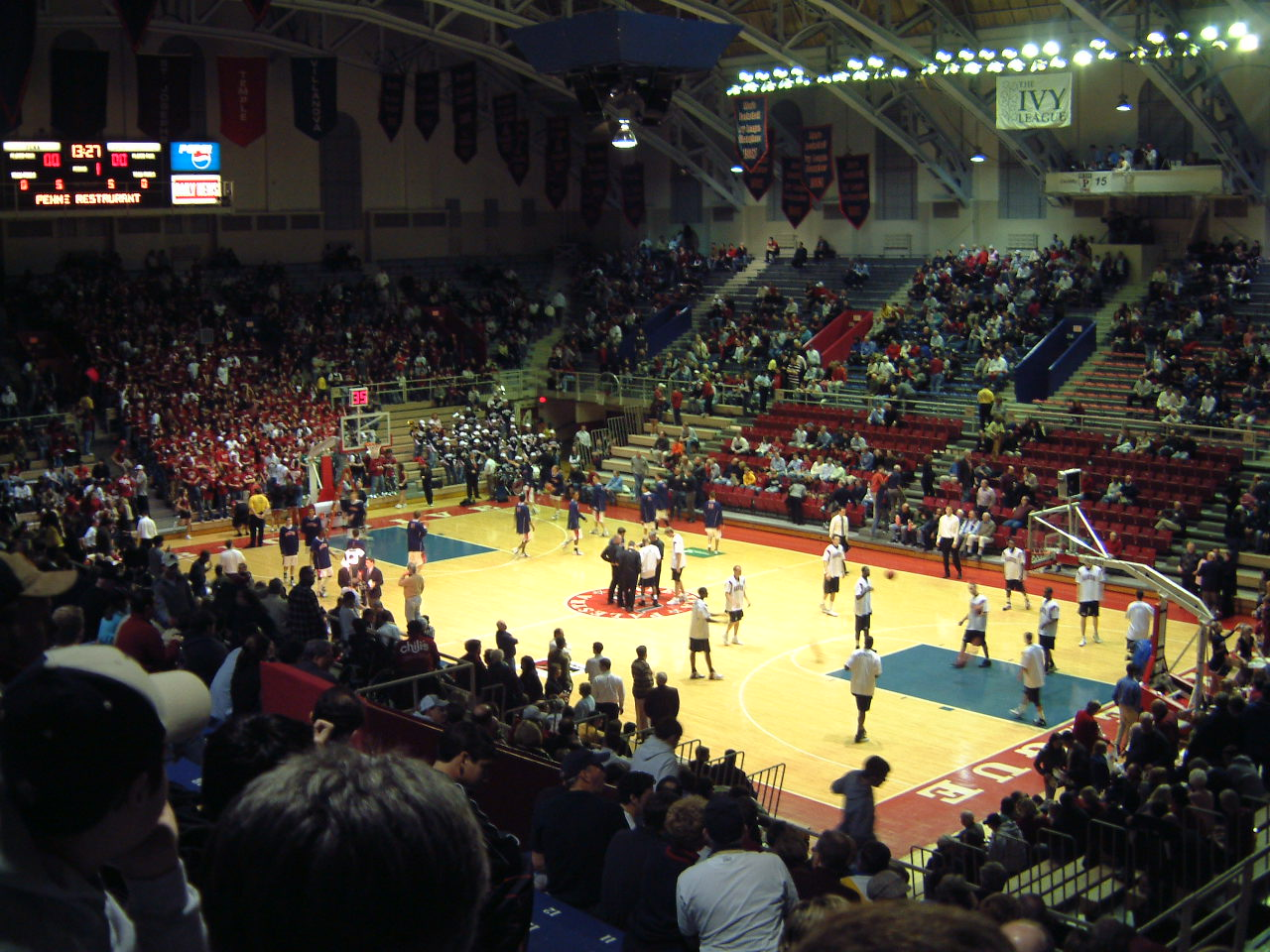
- Interactive map of The Palestra
- Location: 235 S 33rd St; Philadelphia, PA 19104
- Coordinates: 39°57′05″N 75°11′19″W
- Owner: University of Pennsylvania
- Operator: University of Pennsylvania
- Capacity: 8,725
- Public transit: Penn Medicine Station; SEPTA bus: 21, 30, 42, 49, LUCY
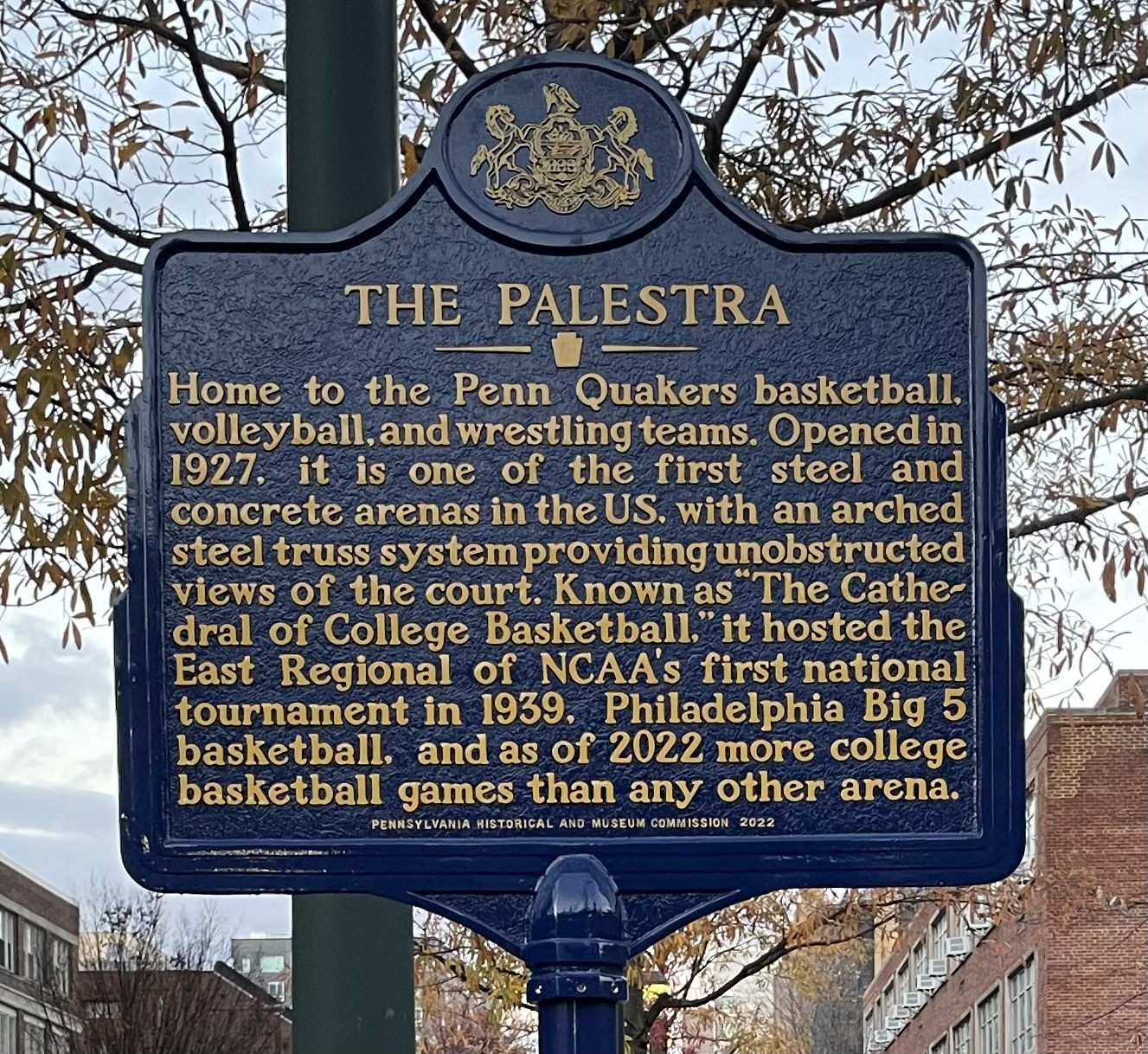
- Historical marker

Construction
- Groundbreaking: 1926
- Opened: January 1, 1927
- Architect: Charles Klauder

Tenants
- Penn Quakers men's basketball (1927–present); Penn Quakers men's wrestling (1927–present); La Salle Explorers men's basketball (1955–1989); Philadelphia Big 5 (1955–1999); Temple Owls men's basketball (1955–1984); Penn Quakers women's basketball (1970–present); La Salle Explorers women's basketball (1972–1989); Philadelphia Rage (ABL) (1997–1998); Saint Joseph's Hawks men's basketball (2008–2009)

The Palestra is a historic arena and the home gym of the Penn Quakers men's and women's basketball teams, volleyball teams, and wrestling team. Located at 235 South 33rd St. on the campus of the University of Pennsylvania, in the University City section of Philadelphia, Pennsylvania, the arena opened on January 1, 1927. The Palestra is particularly regarded for its importance in the history of college basketball. Nicknamed "The Cathedral of College Basketball", the arena has been called "the most important building in the history of college basketball" and is said to have "changed the entire history of the sport for which it was built".

The arena originally seated about 10,000, but now seats 8,725 for basketball. The Palestra is famed for its close-to-the-court seating with the bleachers ending at the floor with no barrier to separate the fans from the game.

At the time of its construction, the Palestra was one of the world's largest arenas. It was one of the first steel-and-concrete arenas in the United States and also one of the first to be constructed without interior pillars blocking the view.

Since its inception, the Palestra has hosted more games, more visiting teams, and more NCAA tournaments than any other facility in college basketball.

== History ==
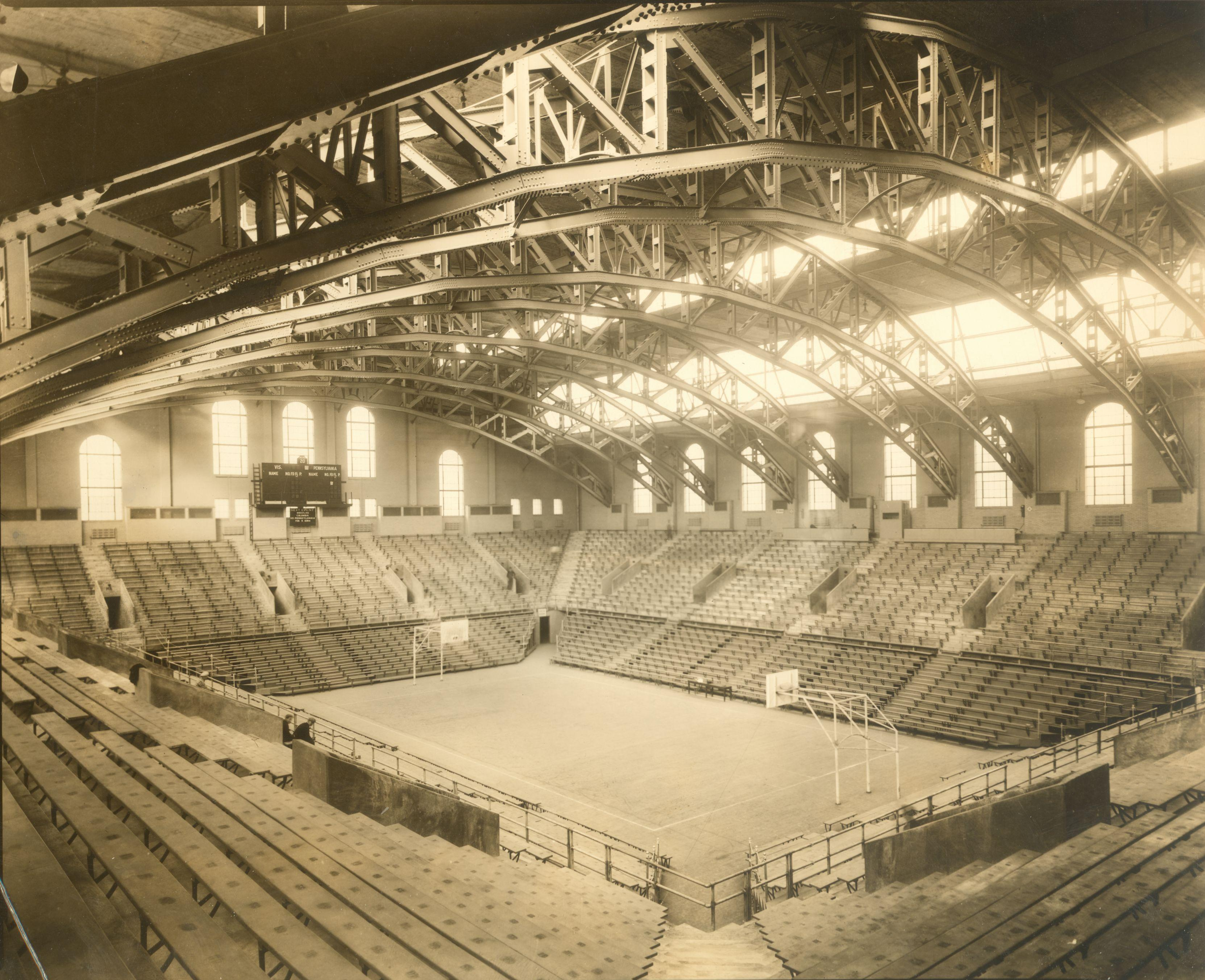
Palestra (1927)

The cornerstone of the new building was laid on December 23, 1926 by Sydney E. Hutchinson, chairman of the Council on Athletics of the university. A metal box was placed in the stone in which was placed United States coinage, a history of Franklin Field, a history of Penn basketball, a Pennsylvania Gazette, Philadelphia daily newspapers, and a photograph of the season's captain of the Penn basketball team, Paul Davenport.

The building was completed in 1926 and named by Greek professor William N. Bates after the ancient Greek term palæstra, a rectangular enclosure attached to a gymnasium where athletes would compete in various sports in front of an audience. Penn's Palestra was built adjacent to and today is connected to Hutchinson Gymnasium.

The first basketball game at the Palestra was played on December 30, 1926 when Penn's second team hosted and beat the Pennsylvania Military College 21 to 17 in front of 2,000 spectators. The Philadelphia Inquirer wrote, "So much splendor beamed from the high walls, the concrete stands, and the huge open ceiling that the game paled in comparison. It was hardly a befitting opening for the Palestra, but as the official dedication has been saved until Saturday, Penn will have another chance throw wide the doors of the hall in a blaze of glory."

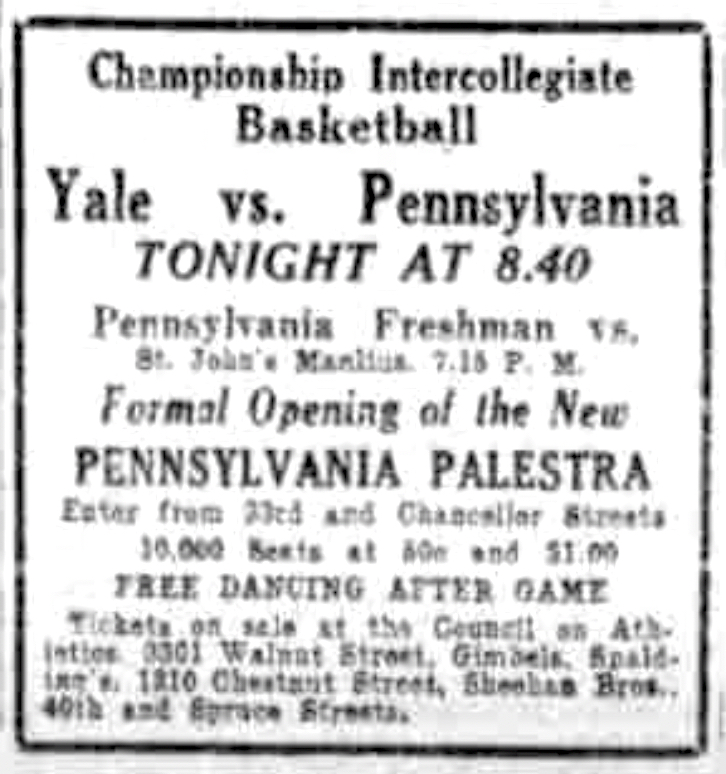
"Formal Opening of the New Pennsylvania Palestra" in Philadelphia Inquirer on January 1, 1927

The Palestra hosted its first varsity basketball game on January 1, 1927. Pennsylvania defeated Yale 26–15 before a crowd of 9,000 then the largest crowd ever to attend a basketball game on the East Coast. Tickets to the first game were advertised for sale at one-dollar for reserved tickets and fifty cents for general admission. Dancing was held after the game at no additional charge.

For many years, the building shared the same management as Madison Square Garden in New York City. Teams wishing to play at the Manhattan venue were often required to schedule a game at the Palestra, which thereby hosted several very high-level sporting events. Many professional games were played at the Palestra before the completion of the Spectrum in 1967.

The arena hosted the 1968 Intercontinental Cup basketball tournament. however less than 1,000 spectators turned out for the double-header on January 4, 1968.

The Palestra's 50th Anniversary was celebrated on February 10, 1977.

During the 2011 NBA lockout, on September 25, 2011, a team including NBA stars LeBron James, Chris Paul, and Carmelo Anthony took on Team Philly, a team of NBA players with connections to the Philadelphia area. Team Philly won the game 131–122 in front of 8,725 attendees.

== College basketball at the Palestra ==
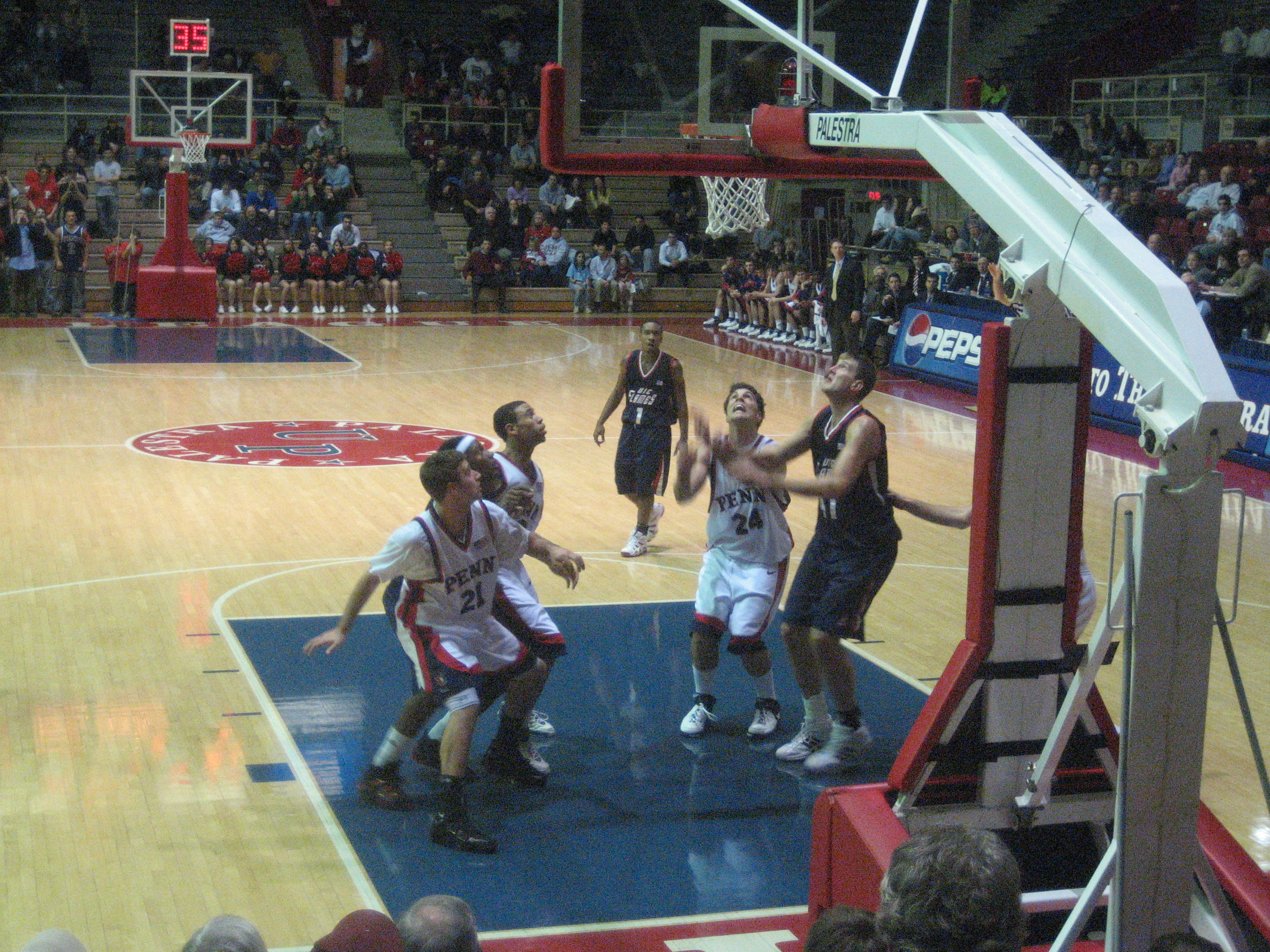
Penn playing at the Palestra in December 2006

The Palestra has hosted more regular season or post-season NCAA men's basketball games, more visiting teams, and more NCAA tournaments than any other U.S. arena. It is often called "the birthplace of college basketball". It has hosted the East regionals six times (most recently in 1980), and the sub-regionals ten times (most recently in 1984). In total, 52 NCAA Tournament games have been played at the gym since it first came to Penn's campus in 1939.

The Philadelphia Big 5 (Penn, Saint Joseph's, Temple, La Salle, Villanova) originally played all of its games at the Palestra. Today, the intra-city conference still plays about half of its round-robin games there. St. Joseph's hosts its Big 5 games at the gym, which is larger than its own Michael Hagan Arena, formerly Alumni Memorial Fieldhouse. During the 2008-09 basketball season, Saint Joseph's played all their home games at the Palestra while the then Alumni Memorial Fieldhouse was undergoing an extensive renovation to become the Hagan Arena. The annual Battle of 33rd Street between Penn and Drexel was also held at the Palestra until 2013, when the series was suspended due to a location dispute. In 2015, the series resumed; however, it became a home-and-home series alternating between The Palestra and Daskalakis Athletic Center every year.

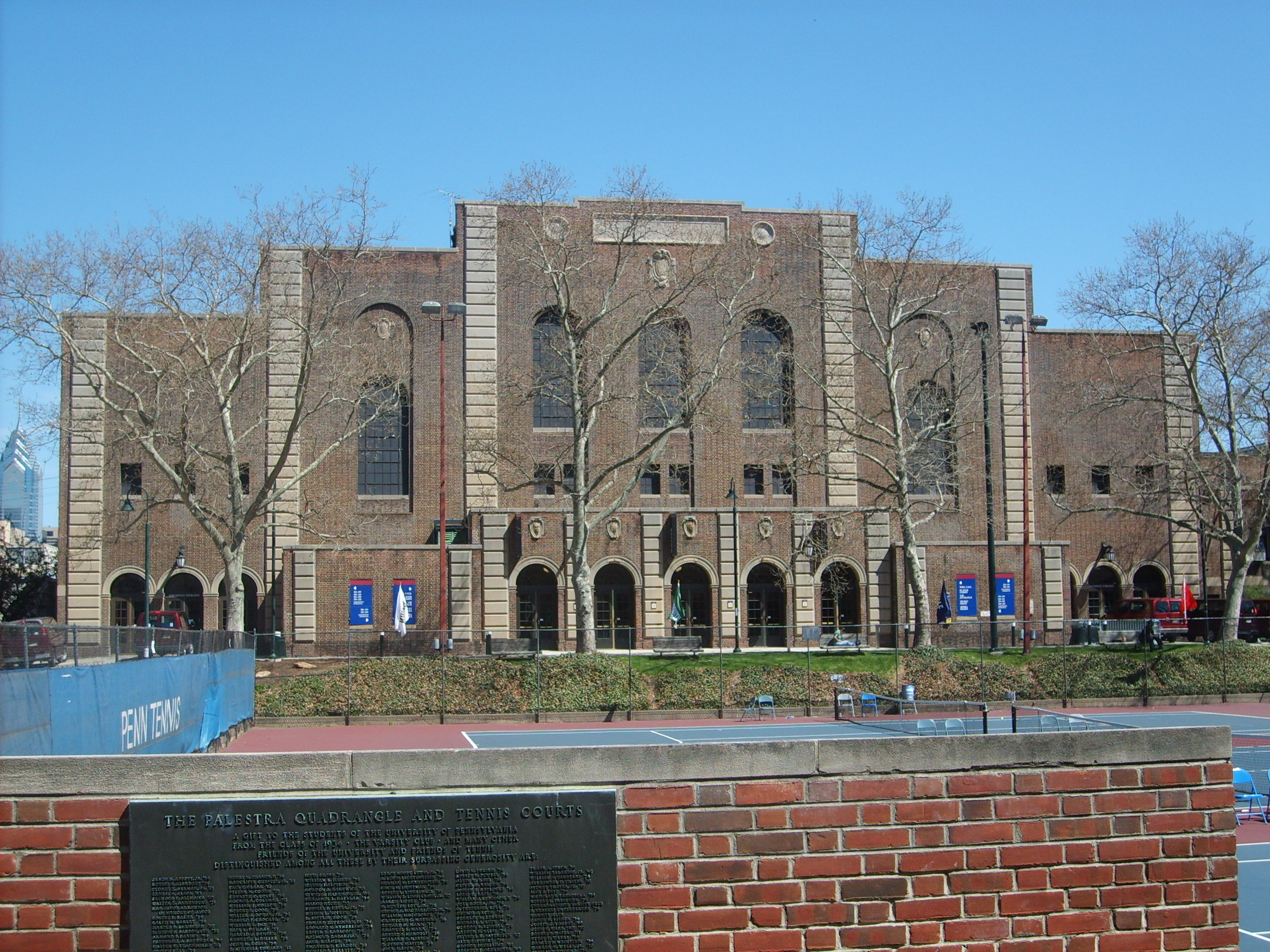
Exterior of the Palestra in April 2007

In addition, parts or all of the 1989-95 Atlantic 10 Conference men's basketball tournaments were contested there, as were the 1985 MEAC men's basketball tournament and the inaugural Ivy League men's and women's tournaments in 2017. The gym has also served as the site of many Philadelphia and PIAA championship games.

The Palestra hosted a Big Ten Conference game between Michigan State and Penn State on January 7, 2017, with the "home-standing" Nittany Lions prevailing 72–63. Penn State has continued to play one home game per year at the Palestra; typically these games are held during the winter break to allow students and alumni from Philadelphia a chance to see the team locally. The 2026–27 contest will break from the usual pattern and not be an early-season Big Ten game over the holidays, but rather a non-conference meeting with rivals Pitt in November.

The 2017 Ivy League men's basketball tournament (March 11–12, 2017) and the 2018 Ivy League men's basketball tournament (March 10–11, 2018) were held at the Palestra.

== 2000 renovation ==
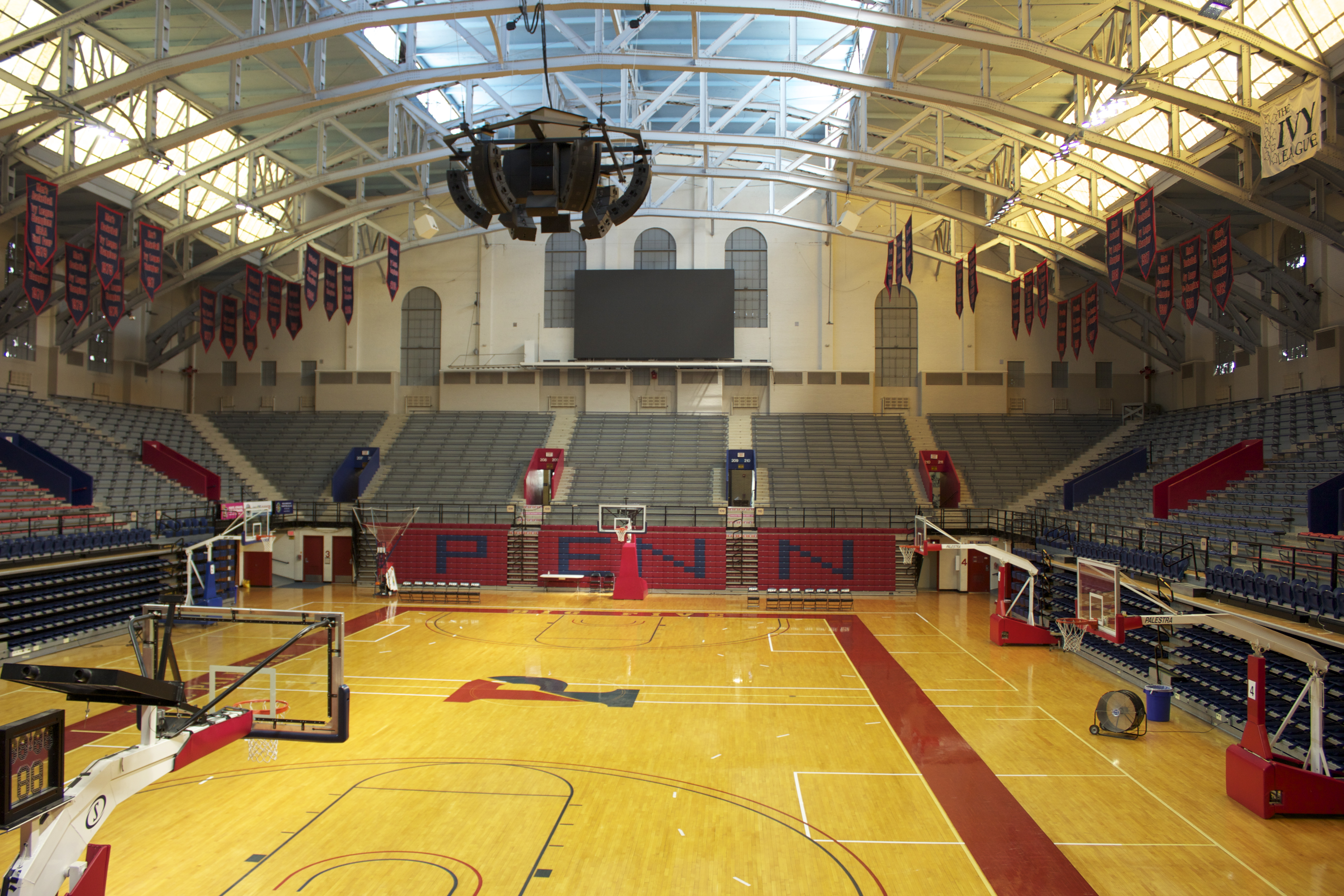
An empty Palestra in 2016

In 2000, a $2 million renovation to the gym added a museum celebrating the history of Philadelphia basketball in the building's main concourse. Near the main entrance to the gym is a section recognizing the St. Joseph's acclaimed Hawk mascot who made its first appearance at the Palestra on Jan. 4, 1956. At the other end of the concourse, by the ramp to sections 211 and 210, a scoreboard lists the all-time record of the Penn-Princeton rivalry. Each decade, from the 1950s onward, has its own exhibit in the concourse. The 1970s section, "A Decade of Prominence", celebrates the Final Four runs by Villanova (1971) and Penn (1979).

In the summer of 2007, ESPN Classic broadcast a one-hour documentary on the historic arena, entitled "The Palestra: Cathedral of Basketball". It traces the evolution of college basketball through the rise of the arena. NBA great Bill Bradley, Naismith Hall of Fame Coaches Chuck Daly, Jack Ramsay and John Chaney, best-selling sports author John Feinstein, Penn Band director R. Greer Cheeseman III, and then-CBS/ESPN analyst Bill Raftery are interviewed. The film was written, produced and directed by former Penn women's basketball player Mikaelyn Austin (founder of Philly Philms).

== See also ==
- Franklin Field
- List of NCAA Division I basketball arenas
