= William W. Edel =

- Born: March 16, 1894; Baltimore
- Died: September 16, 1996 (aged 102); El Cajon, California
- Occupation: University President

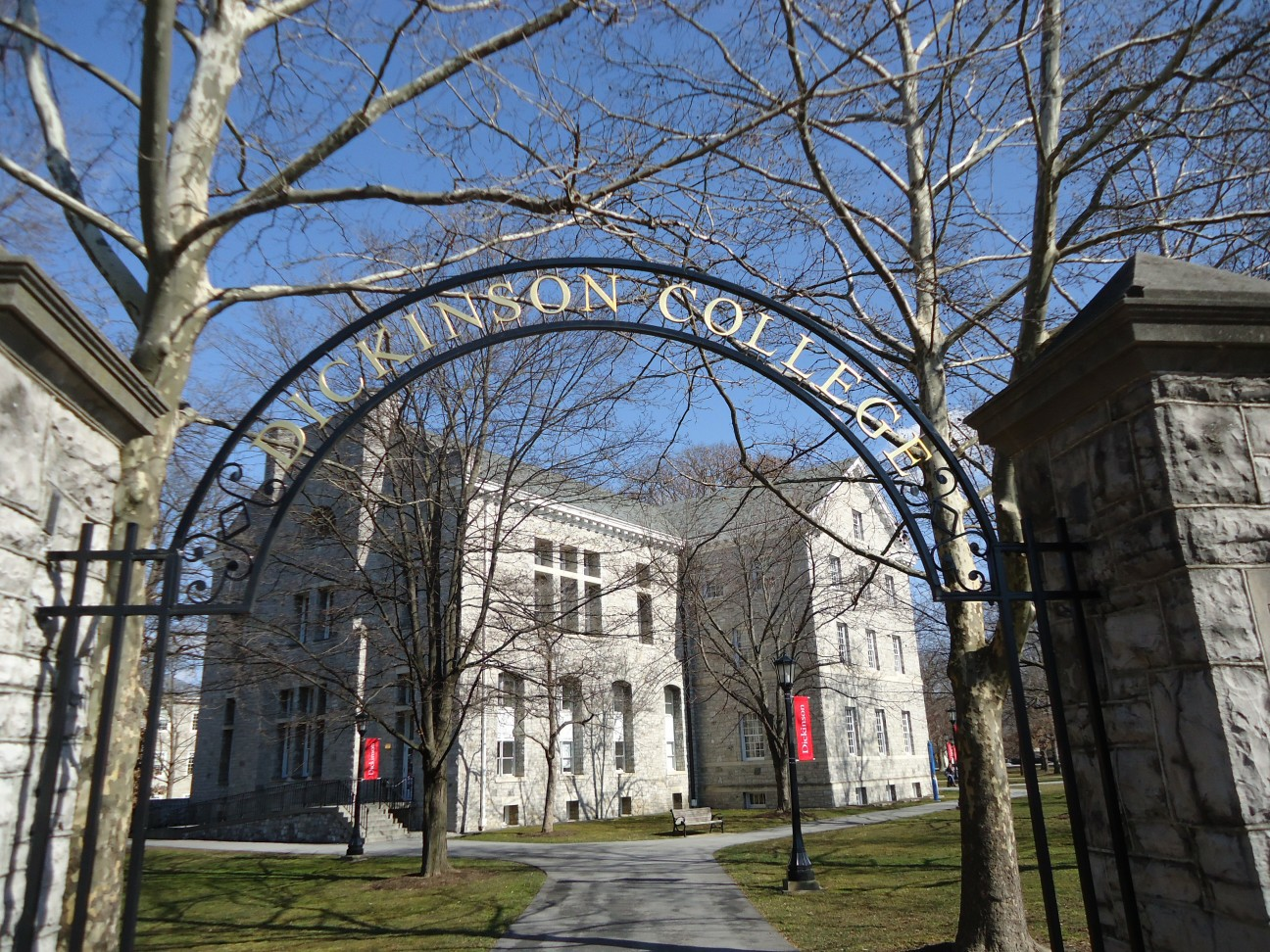
Edel served as President of Dickinson College in Carlisle, Pennsylvania, from 1946 to 1959.

William W. Edel (March 16, 1894 – September 16, 1996) was a minister of the Methodist Episcopal Church, United States Navy Chaplain and 22nd President of Dickinson College.

== Biography ==
William Wilcox Edel was born March 16, 1894, in Baltimore. He attended Friends School of Baltimore, Baltimore City College, Dickinson College and Boston University School of Theology.

=== Early Boy Scout ===
Edel was one of the earliest Boy Scouts in America. As a member of Troop 1 of Mount Washington in the summer of 1910, Edel attended the first National Boy Scout Camp held in August at Silver Bay on Lake George in upstate New York. This experimental camp was conducted by Chief Scout Ernest Thompson Seton, the noted author and wildlife artist. The camp included 120 boys and 20 adults, many from YMCA along the northeast, already involved in Seton’s Woodcraft Indians. As Edel put it, “I came to the camp as a Woodcraft Indian and left as a Boy Scout.”

=== Navy Chaplain ===
Edel was a Navy Chaplain from 1917–1946.

=== College President ===
In 1946, Dr. Edel accepted the position as the twenty-second President of Dickinson College, remaining as such for the next thirteen years, until 1959.

== Honors, decorations, awards and distinctions ==
- Phi Beta Kappa, 1915
- Honorary Doctor of Divinity, Dickinson College, 1935

== Published works ==
- Edel, William W. My Hundred Years, 1894–1994. El Cajon, CA: L. Mailliw, 1994. Print.
