= R. Greer Cheeseman III =

American musical director

Robert "Greer" Cheeseman III (born February 10, 1955) is the current director of The University of Pennsylvania Band. He served as assistant director to the band following his graduation from Penn in 1977 and was promoted to director in 1994.

Greer is one of the originators of the toast throwing tradition at Penn. While a student, he was inspired by the Rocky Horror Picture Show tradition of throwing toast at the screen when Dr. Frank N. Furter asks for "a toast to absent friends". At the end of the third quarter of every home football game the band plays the school song "Drink a Highball", whose final line is "Here's a toast to dear old Penn." Greer and his friends began throwing toast onto the field while singing "Drink a Highball" and the tradition has lived on ever since. While at Penn, Cheeseman was a member of Alpha Chi Rho.
