= The Red and Blue =

University of Pennsylvania song

"The Red and Blue" is a popular song of the University of Pennsylvania, a private Ivy League university in Philadelphia.

"The Red and Blue", while not the official alma mater of the University of Pennsylvania, is so popular that it is often played in place of it at official university functions. (The alma mater of the university is Hail, Pennsylvania!.) The song dates from the end of the 19th century. Traditionally men would remove their hats for this song and wave them in time to the refrain. One still sees remnants of this custom when students wave their arms while singing the song's chorus.

The words were written by Harry E. Westervelt (Class of 1898), and the music was composed by William John Goeckel (B.A. 1895, LL.B. 1896). Goeckel was known among his classmates as a musician and composer and was both a member and leader of the Penn Glee Club during his time at Penn. The song's copyright was originally held by W. H. Boner & Company.

== Lyrics ==
Verse

Come all ye loyal classmen now,

in hall and campus through,

Lift up your hearts and voices for the royal Red and Blue.

Fair Harvard has her crimson,

Old Yale her colors too

But for dear Pennsylvan-I-ah,

We wear the Red and Blue.

Chorus

Hurrah! Hurrah! Pennsylvani-I-ah!

Hurrah for the Red and Blue!

Hurrah! Hurrah! Hurrah! Hurrah!

Hurrah for the Red and Blue!
