= Fight on, Pennsylvania! =

University of Pennsylvania fight song

"Fight on, Pennsylvania!" is the University of Pennsylvania's primary fight song. The song's lyrics were written by Ben S. McGiveran (Class of 1923) during his sophomore year. The music was composed by David Zoob (also Class of 1923 and Penn Law Class of 1927). The copyright was held by the Houston Club. (However, the Houston Club was deemed unnecessary and replaced by a separate entity in 1929—the Houston Hall Board. The name Houston Club is still used as nickname for the student union.) The chorus of "Fight on, Pennsylvania!" is played by The University of Pennsylvania Band every time the Pennsylvania football team scores. The lyrics are also sung.
