= Ten Eyck =

Ten Eyck is a Dutch toponymic surname meaning "at the oak". Extinct in the Netherlands, most people belong to a single American family descended from Coenraadt Ten Eyck, who arrived from the Netherlands around 1651. It may refer to:

- Albert A. Ten Eyck Brown (1878–1940), Albany-born architect in Atlanta
- Egbert Ten Eyck (1779–1844), U.S. Representative from New York
- Edward Ten Eyck (died 1958), champion rower and coach, son of James A. Ten Eyck
- Jacob Coenraedt Ten Eyck (1705–1793), New York lawyer and politician
- Jacob H. Ten Eyck (1708–1776), New York merchant and politician
- James A. Ten Eyck (1851–1938), champion rower and coach, Ten Eyck Trophy namesake
- John Adams Ten Eyck III (1893–1932), painter and etcher
- John C. Ten Eyck (1814–1879), U.S. Senator from New Jersey
- Karen TenEyck (born 1958), American scenic and graphic designer
- Maude E. Ten Eyck (1902–1977), New York politician
- Perry Ten Eyck (1907–1959), college basketball coach
- Peter G. Ten Eyck (1873–1944), U.S. Representative from New York

== See also ==
- Ten Eyck Houses, original name of the Williamsburg Houses, in Williamsburg, Brooklyn
- Van Eyck, Dutch surname of similar origin
