= SS Samoa =

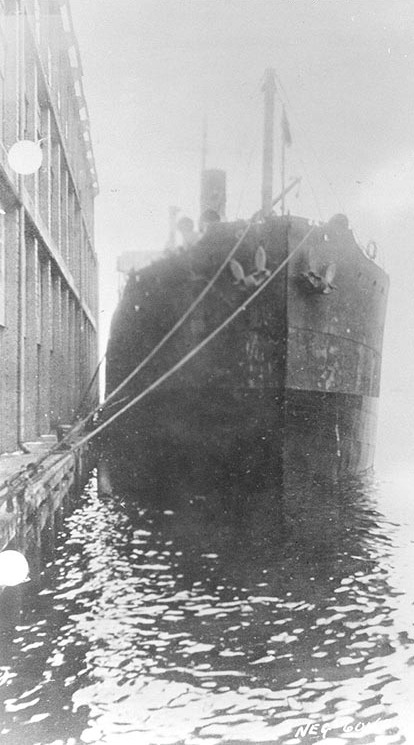
- USS Lake Pepin, in 1923 Samoa

History

United States
- Name: 1918: Muerthe; 1918: USS Lake Pepin (ID 4215); 1923: Samoa
- Namesake: 1918: Lake Pepin, Minnesota; 1923: Samoa
- Port of registry: 1919: Savannah; 1923: San Francisco
- Builder: McDougall Duluth Shipbuilding Company
- Launched: 30 March 1918
- Completed: August 1918
- Acquired: 4 September 1918
- Commissioned: 4 September 1918
- Decommissioned: 18 June 1919
- Identification: 1918: ID number ID–4215; US official number 216718; until 1933: code letters LMJT; by 1934: call sign KTUI
- Fate: scrapped 1947

General characteristics as USS Lake Pepin
- Tonnage: 1,997 GRT, 1,172 NRT, 3,600 DWT
- Displacement: 4,500 tons
- Length: 251.1 ft (76.5 m)
- Beam: 43.6 ft (13.3 m)
- Draft: 17 ft 9 in (5.41 m)
- Depth: 19.1 ft (5.8 m)
- Installed power: 1 × triple-expansion engine, 274 NHP
- Propulsion: 1 × screw
- Speed: 9 kn (17 km/h)
- Complement: WW1: 122
- Armament: WW1: 2 x 3"/50 caliber guns

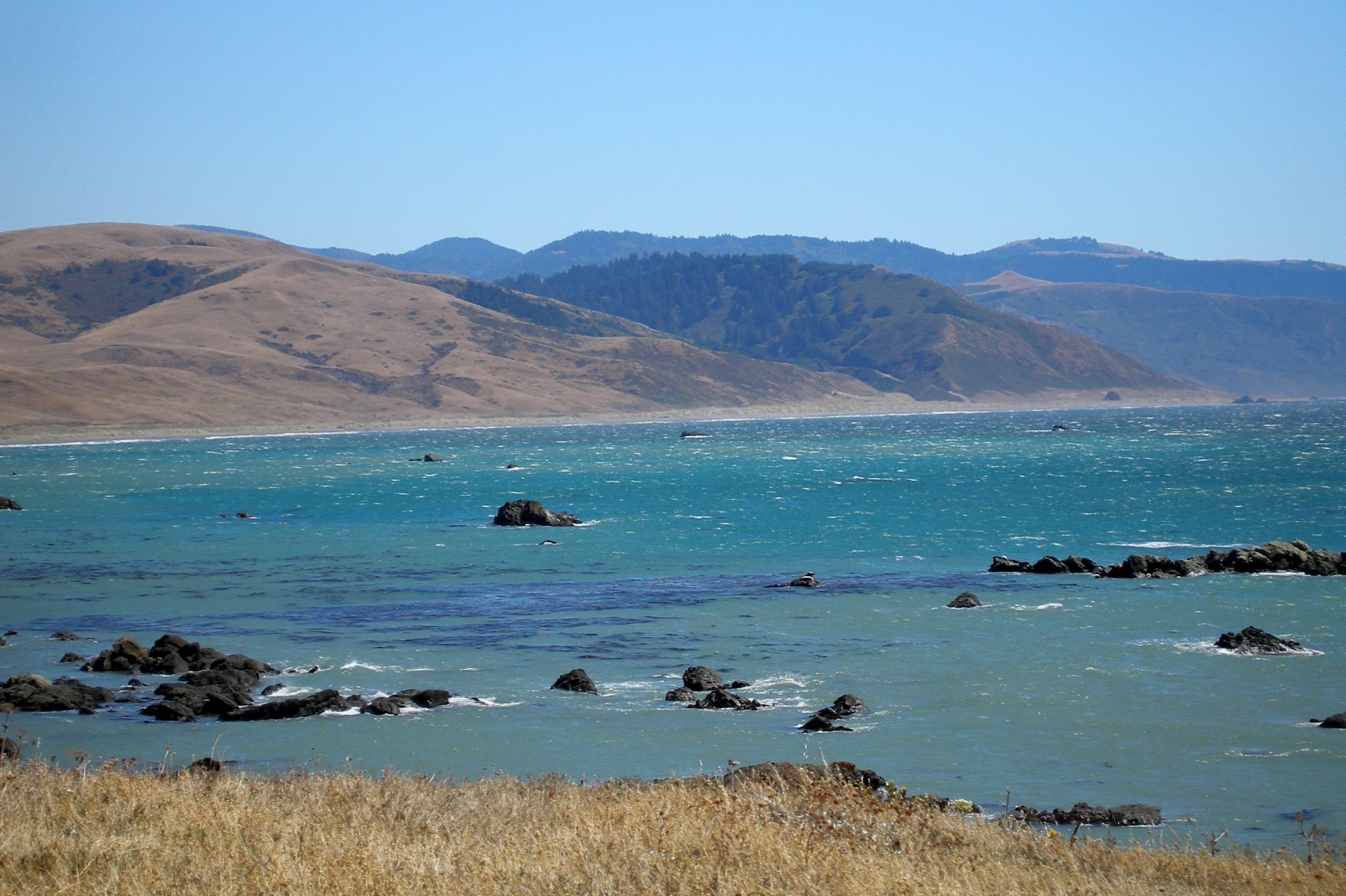
Cape Mendocino Coast

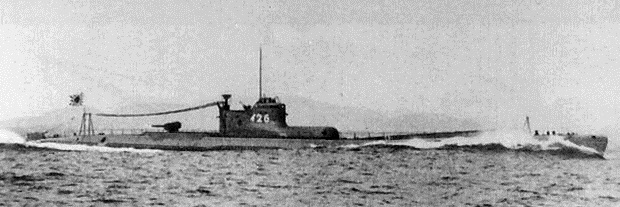
Japanese submarine I-26, sister of I-17

SS Samoa was a 1,997 GRT cargo steamship that escaped an attack off the coast of California soon after the US entered World War II. She was built under a United States Shipping Board (USSB) contract in 1918 as Muerthe, but was launched as USS Lake Pepin, named after Lake Pepin, by the McDougall Duluth Shipbuilding Company of Duluth, Minnesota, measured at 3,600 tons deadweight. She had a triple expansion engine steam engine with 1,250 horsepower (930 kW), a 251-foot (77 m) length, 43.5-foot (13.3 m) beam, a draft of 17 feet 8 1/2 inches (5.398 m), a top speed of 9.25 knots (17.13 km/h; 10.64 mph). The vessel had a crew of 52, with the hull # 9 and O.N.ID # 21699. USS Lake Pepin (ID # 4215) was owned and operated by the United States Navy, commissioned at Montreal, Quebec, Canada on 4 September 1918. For World War I she was fitted with one 3"/50 caliber gun. The Navy put her in Naval Overseas Transportation Service as a coal carrier traveling between the United Kingdom and France as a United States Navy Temporary auxiliary ship. Her coal service ended in May 1919. In June 1919 she returned to the US with a cargo of World War I vehicles and weapons and unused ammunition. The US Navy decommissioned the Lake Pepin on 18 June 1919. In 1923 she was, renamed Samoa purchased and operated by the Hammond Lumber Company. In 1936 she was sold to the Wheeler Logging Company of Portland, Oregon. In February of 1941 she was sold to W. A. Schaefer Company.

== World War II ==
After the attack on Pearl Harbor on 7 December 1941, the United States entered World War II. The Imperial Japanese Navy sent submarines to attack ships off Coastal California. On 18 December 1941 at about 5 am the Samoa was 15 miles (24 km) off Cape Mendocino, Humboldt County, California near Humboldt Bay, near the town of Petrolia, when Japanese submarine I-17 fired 83-pound (38 kg) artillery shells at her from her single 14 cm (5.5 in) naval gun. The Samoa was en route to San Diego with a load of lumber.I-17, far from home, was ordered to conserve torpedoes, so Commander Nishino Kozo opened the attack with artillery fire. Samoa the sub was spotted just before it fired on the ship. The captain of Samoa, Nels Sinnes, gave the order for the crew to report to their lifeboat stations and prepare the lifeboat. I-17 fired five shells at Samoa, none hit the ship, but shell fragments fell to the deck's stern. Ocean swells prevented I-17 from getting a direct hit. Nishino had orders to use only one torpedo on a merchant ship and then only if necessary. The swells and pitching deck made Nishino decided a torpedo was necessary. I-17 fired a torpedo while 70 yards (64 m) from Samoa. The Samoa watched as the torpedo's wake approached them amidships. They watched as the torpedo passed under the ship, continued and after passing the ship exploded. The explosion gave off smoke and flames, with torpedo fragments falling on Samoa's deck. It was very dark and foggy that early morning and Nishino was unsure of the damage he had done to the Samoa. So he moved in closer to inspect the ship. At 40 feet (12 m) away from the ship the Samoa's crew heard a Hi ya! from the sub. Captain Sinnes replied What do you want of us?, but there was no answer. Then the sub departed in the darkness. Sinnes then realized that the sub had inspected the side of the ship that had a damaged lifeboat form a previous storm and that the sub came close enough to see that the Samoa was listing, as the ship's engineers had been shifting water in the ballast tanks. Parts of the damaged lifeboat were hanging on the davit and it look like an explosion could have done the damage. Later Captain Sinnes thoughts on the sub's departure were confirmed. Captain Nishino sent a radio message to Japanese submarine I-15, that was near San Francisco, that he had sunk an American merchant ship. At 7 am daybreak Samoa departed at full speed towards San Diego and arrived at port two days later. Samoa was scrapped in 1947 at Pittsburgh, Pennsylvania. I-17 was sunk on 19 August 1943 by the New Zealand HMNZS Tui and United States Navy Kingfisher floatplanes, off Noumea.

== Sister ships ==
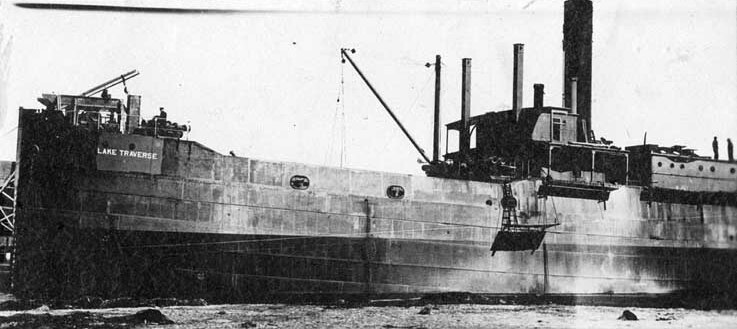
USS Lake Traverse

USS Lake Pepin / Samoa had eight sister ships built as Lake freighters. All nine were built in 1918 by McDougall-Duluth Company of Duluth, Minnesota with a 3,600 ton deadweight. The nine ships were built under United States Shipping Board (USSB) contract # 1320.

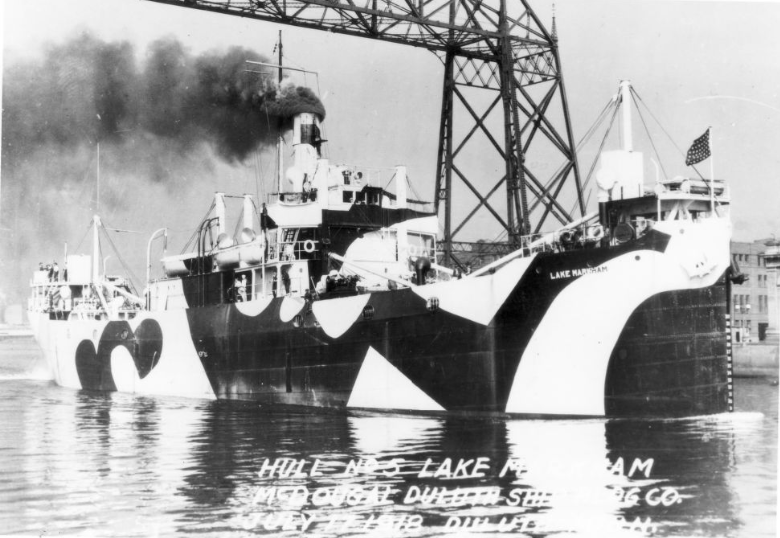
Lake Markham in 1918

- USS Lakemoor or USS Lake Moor (Hull # 2 ID-215770) was torpedoed and sank on 11 April 1918, on maiden voyage as Navy coal ship (ID 2180), during World War I by the U-boat SM UB-64 in the Irish Sea, off Corsewall Lighthouse, Scotland. Lost were 46 crew members. The ship was named after Lakemoor, Illinois.
- USS Lake Portage (Hull# 4) (216409) was torpedoed and sank on 3 August 1918, during World War I by SM UB-88 just south of Audierne, France. Lost were three crew members and six survived with burns.
- USS Lake Indian (ID-4215-A) (216990), no Navy service, took on water and sank on 25 January 1927, near Sand Key Light, Florida.
- USS Lake Traverse (ID-2782) (Hull #3) (21615), Navy coal ship 1918–1919, In 1925 operated as private ship, took on water due steel plate failure and sank near Tortuga Island, Haiti in the Caribbean on 6 July 1955. Ordered as War Centaur, name changed before delivery in April 1918. Named after Lake Traverse.
- Lake Markham (Hull # 5 ID 216587, ID-4215-C) ordered as Allette, no Navy service, Chicago in 1927, scrapped in 1937.
- Lake Geneva (Hull # 7 ID 216827), renamed John J. O'Hagan in 1925, Manomet (AG-37) in 1941, Aries (AK-51) for World War II in 1942, John J. O'Hagan in 1946, Adelanto in 1947 and scrapped in 1952.

Koma, formerly Lake Helen

- Lake Helen (Hull # 8 ID 216892) ordered as, before delivery Macon. Renamed York in 1926, Skogak in 1929, Kama in 1933, and scrapped in 1970
- Lake Orange (Hull # 10 ID 217151) ordered as, before delivery Zenith City. Renamed John Gehm in 1923, Menemsha (AG-39) in 1941 for World War II, WAG 274, John Gehm in 1946, and scrapped in 1950.

== See also ==
- Attack on Pearl Harbor
- SS Dorothy Phillips
- California during World War II
- SS Agwiworld
- SS Barbara Olson
- SS Samoa (1943), a Liberty ship built in 1943 and scrapped in 1971.
