= Frank Greer =

American rower (1879–1943)

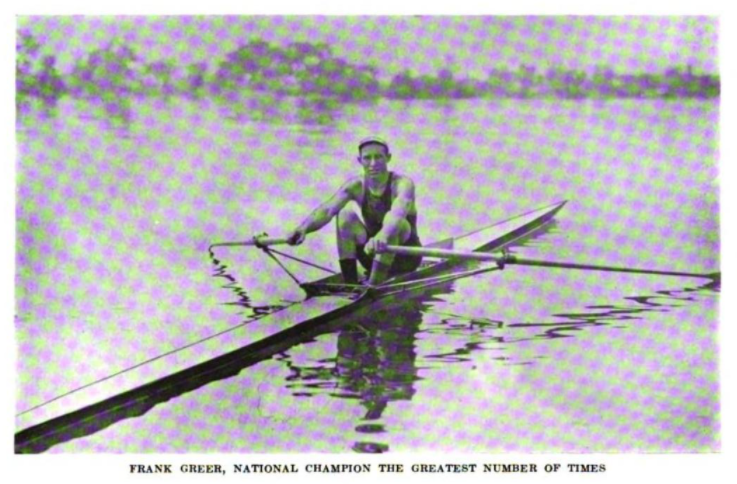

Personal information
- Full name: Frank Bartholomew Greer
- Born: February 26, 1879 East Boston, Massachusetts, USA
- Died: May 7, 1943 (aged 64) Winthrop, Massachusetts, USA
Medal record
Men's rowing
Representing United States
Olympic Games
| Gold medal – first place | 1904 St. Louis | Single sculls |

Frank Bartholomew Greer (February 26, 1879 – May 7, 1943) was an American rower who competed in the 1904 Summer Olympics.

== Rowing career ==
A native of East Boston, Greer was a member of the East Boston Amateur Athletic Boat Club. He held the National Association of Amateur Oarsmen single sculls title from 1904 to 1095. On July 30, 1904, he won an Olympic gold medal in the single sculls competition with a time of 10:08.5 at the age of 25. The final was held at Creve Coeur Lake in Maryland Heights, Missouri, where he beat out James Juvenal (silver) and Constance Titus (bronze).

== After rowing ==
After his retirement, Greer coached at the Detroit Athletic Club and later in life became a sheriff at the Charles Street Jail in Boston.

Sporting positions
| Preceded by Constance Titus | National Association of Amateur Oarsmen Championship Single Sculls; 1904–1905 | Succeeded by Constance Titus |
