= Lothar Bucher =

Aide of German chancellor Otto von Bismarck (1817–1892)

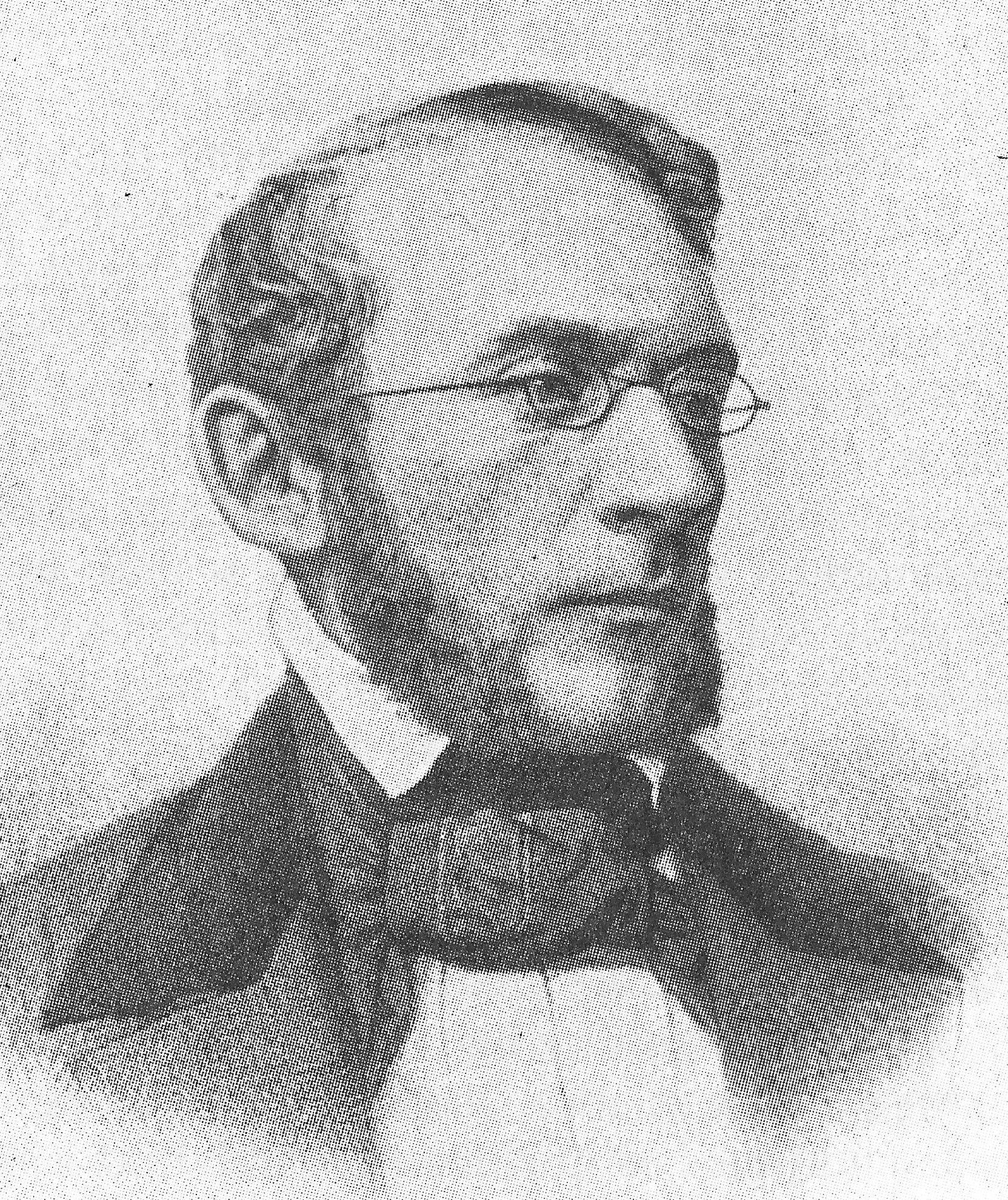
Lothar Bucher.

Lothar Bucher (25 October 1817 – 12 October 1892) was a German publicist and trusted aide of German chancellor Otto von Bismarck.

Bucher was born in Neustettin, Pomerania, his father being master at a gymnasium. After studying at the University of Berlin he adopted the legal profession. Elected a member of the National Assembly in Berlin in 1848, he was an active leader against the democratic party. With others of his colleagues he was in 1850 brought to trial for having taken part in organizing a movement for refusal to pay taxes; he was condemned to fifteen months imprisonment in a fortress, but left the country before the sentence was executed.

For ten years he lived in exile, chiefly in London; he acted as special correspondent of the National Zeitung, and gained a great knowledge of English life; and he published a work, Der Parliamentarismus wie er ist, a criticism of parliamentary government, which shows a marked change in his political opinions.

In 1860, Bucher returned to Germany, and became intimate with Ferdinand Lassalle, who made him his literary executor. In 1864 he was offered by Bismarck a high position in the Prussian foreign office, which he accepted. The reasons that led him to a step which involved so complete a break with his earlier friends and associations are not clearly known. From this time until his death he acted as Bismarck's aide, gaining a large amount of his confidence.

It was Bucher who drew up the text of the constitution of the North German Confederation; in 1870 he was sent on a confidential mission to Spain in connection with the Hohenzollern candidature for the Spanish crown, (although Eyck states that it was in fact the Prussian diplomat and historian Theordor von Bernhardi); he assisted Bismarck at the final negotiations for the Treaty of Frankfurt, and was one of the secretaries to the Congress of Berlin; he also assisted Bismarck in the composition of his memoirs.

Bucher, who was a man of great ability, had considerable influence, which was especially directed against the economic doctrines of the Liberals; in 1881 he published a pamphlet criticizing the influence and principles of the Cobden Club. He identified himself completely with Bismarck's later commercial and colonial policy, and probably had much to do with introducing it, and he did much to encourage anti-British feeling in Germany. He died at Glion, Switzerland.
