= Eyck =

Eyck may refer to:

- Eyck Zimmer (born 1969), German born English chef
- Carolina Eyck (born 1987), German musician
- Charles Eyck (1897-1983), Dutch visual artist
- Erich Eyck (1878–1964), German historian

== See also ==
- Van Eyck (disambiguation)
- Ten Eyck (disambiguation)
