= Liber diversarum arcium =

First page of the Liber in MS H 277

The anonymous Liber diversarum arcium ('Book of various arts') is a medieval handbook of painting. It contains over 500 art-technological instructions or recipes in Latin, forming a complete structured painting course. It is probably the most substantial and comprehensive mediaeval painters' technical recipe book to survive, and summarises the state of the art in the European workshops of the fourteenth century. In particular it is an important witness to the practice of oil painting before Van Eyck. The majority of the recipes are unique.

The Liber diversarum arcium is preserved in Manuscript H 277, fonds ancien, Bibliothèque interuniversitaire, section médecine, Montpellier, France (folios 81v-101v). Although this manuscript dates from circa 1430 and was written in or near Venice, in fact the textual core of the Liber diversarum arcium itself mainly reflects northern European practices, and probably dates from c.1300. This core consists partly of compilations of earlier technical recipes (but re-worked to make them more useful), and partly of newly composed material. During the fourteenth century various material (much of it Italian) was added to this core.

== Content ==
The text is substantial (26,000 words in Latin - thus containing far more on painting than the more famous Theophilus Presbyter), and is unusual among medieval artists' recipe books in being highly structured.

- Book I (the longest) describes the fundamentals of painting: drawing, choice and preparation of pigments, preparing media and tempera, mixing pigments and modelling, and finally gilding.
- Book II describes the advanced techniques, and the variations and refinements in technique, necessary for oil painting on wood: preparation of panels, oils and varnishes, differences in the behaviour of pigments in oil, gilding, imitation sgraffito etc.
- Book III (the shortest) describes the variations in technique and materials needed to paint murals.
- Book IV describes painting on glass and ceramics, and some other auxiliary decorative techniques: gilding, silvering and colouring of metals, dyeing (principally for wood or skins), painting ceramics, painting glass, and making and attaching artificial gems.

== Editions and translations ==
- Clarke, M. (2011). Mediaeval Painters’ Materials and Techniques: The Montpellier ‘Liber diversarum arcium’. London: Archetype Publications. ISBN 978-1-904982-64-7. [A book-length study of the Liber..., including an edition of the Latin, an English translation, a history of the text, and an extended technical commentary.]
- Ravaisson, F. and Libri, G. (1849) Catalogue général des manuscrits des bibliothèques publiques des departments, Vol. 1. Paris: Publié sous les auspices du ministre de l'Instruction publique, Imprimerie National. [Reprinted in facsimile 1968, Gregg International Publishers Ltd., Farnborough]. [Library catalogue, including a description of the manuscript pp. 394–9, and a transcription of the Latin pp. 739–811.]
