= USS Aries (AK-51) =

Cargo ship of the United States Navy

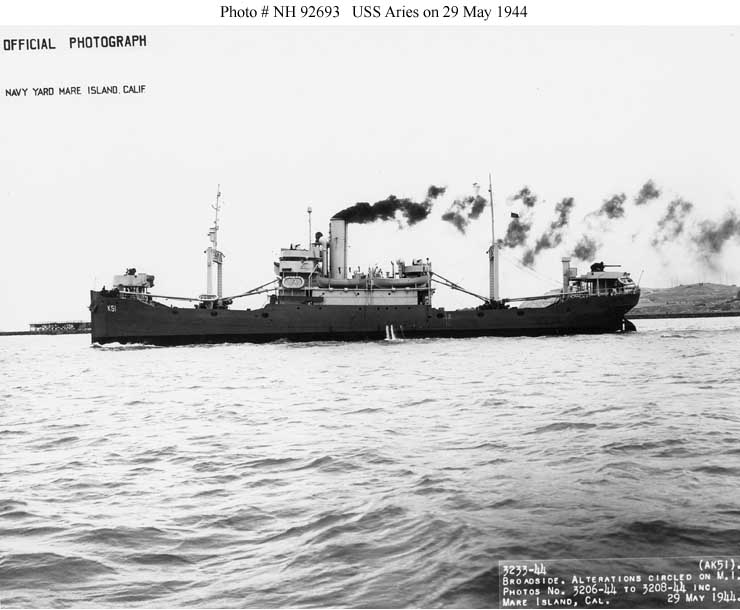
- USS Aries (AK-51) Off the Mare Island Navy Yard, California, on 29 May 1944. She is carrying the main armament of two 3"/50 guns, one forward and one aft, that was fitted when she was manned by a Navy crew and commissioned in July 1942.

History

United States
- Name: USS Lake Geneva (ID-4215-B)
- Namesake: Lake Geneva, Wisconsin
- Builder: McDougall Duluth Shipbuilding Company
- Launched: 22 June 1918
- Acquired: 21 September 1918
- Commissioned: 22 September 1918
- Decommissioned: 17 July 1919
- Fate: United States Shipping Board

United States
- Name: John J. O’Hagan
- Acquired: 22 September 1941
- Renamed: USS Manomet 15 October 1941
- Reclassified: (AG-37) 15 October 1941
- Namesake: Manomet, Massachusetts
- Renamed: USS Aries 7 January 1942
- Reclassified: (AK-51) 7 January 1942
- Namesake: Aries
- Commissioned: 18 July 1942
- Decommissioned: 28 March 1946
- Stricken: 17 April 1946
- Fate: Scrapped 1952

General characteristics as USS Aries
- Displacement: 4,500 tons
- Length: 261 ft (80 m)
- Beam: 43 ft 6 in (13.26 m)
- Draft: 17 ft 10 in (5.44 m)
- Speed: 9.25 knots
- Complement: 122
- Armament: 2 x 3"/50 caliber guns

USS Aries (AK-51) (1918–1952) was a United States Navy cargo ship built as Lake Geneva under a United States Shipping Board (USSB) contract in 1918 at Duluth, Minnesota, by the McDougall Duluth Shipbuilding Company, to augment American logistics capability during World War I. The freighter was delivered to the Navy at Montreal, Quebec, Canada, on 21 September 1918 and was placed in commission the following day for service in the Naval Overseas Transportation Service. Aries was named for the constellation.

After fitting out, the freighter sailed for France late in October and arrived at St. Nazaire on 11 November, the day Germany signed the armistice ending the fighting of World War I. Lake Geneva was then assigned to European waters. Based at Cardiff, Wales, she carried coal from that port and from Belfast, Ireland, to French ports.

After continuing this duty through the spring of 1919, she sailed for Charleston, South Carolina, carrying some 1,500 tons of Army ordnance material. However, while en route to that port, she was diverted to Newport News, Virginia, where she arrived on 12 July.

== Between the wars ==
After discharging her cargo, Lake Geneva was slated for demobilization. She was decommissioned on 17 July 1919 and then returned to the USSB, in whose hands she remained until the mid-1920s. She was then sold to the Bison Steam Ship Company, of Tonawanda, New York, and renamed John J. O'Hagan in honor of the manager of the firm which had purchased her. She operated out of Buffalo, New York carrying coal and iron ore on the Great Lakes.

== World War II service ==
Shortly before the United States entered World War II, the Federal Government repurchased the ship. She was transferred from the Maritime Commission to the US Navy on 22 September 1941. Renamed Manomet on 15 October 1941 and designated AG-37, the freighter was prepared for naval service at East Boston, Massachusetts, by the General Ship and Engine Works. During this work, Manomet was renamed Aries on 7 January 1942 and simultaneously re-designated AK-51. She was delivered on 23 May 1942 to the Marine Lines of New York City, which operated her on a contract basis for the Naval Transportation Service until early July. Returned to Navy custody on 11 July 1942, Aries was placed in commission on 18 July 1942 at the Bethlehem Steel Company in Brooklyn, New York and Lieutenant Philip S. Deane Jr., USNR, assumed temporary command for Commander Leif Sederholt, USNR, who reported a week later.

After taking on cargo, ammunition, and supplies, the cargo ship stood out to sea and joined a convoy bound for Iceland. She stopped at Halifax, Nova Scotia, for three days before resuming her voyage to Iceland. On 18 August, she reached Reykjavík and discharged equipment and supplies ashore. For the next 12 months, Aries operated in Icelandic waters under the orders of Commanding Officer, Naval Operating Base, Iceland, transporting US Army cargo between the Icelandic ports of Reykjavík, Akranes, Keflavík, Hvalfjörður, Budareyri, Seyðisfjörður, and Akureyri.

The ship left Iceland on 21 August 1943, on a course for the United States, and reached Boston, Massachusetts on 3 September. She then entered a shipyard for alterations and repairs. On 5 December, the vessel joined a southbound convoy and sailed to Guantanamo Bay, Cuba. She left Cuba on 5 January 1944, proceeded to the Panama Canal Zone, and moored at Balboa for repairs to her main engine before setting a course for San Diego, California.

Upon reaching San Diego on 12 February, the vessel underwent more repairs to her main engine. Late in April, she entered the Mare Island Navy Yard at Vallejo, California, for replacement of the main engine. After a series of sea trials, the ship got underway on 6 September, bound for Pearl Harbor and arrived there on the 18th. She was drydocked briefly for the installation of a new propeller before sailing for the South Pacific on 6 October.

Aries reached Manus in the Admiralty Islands, on 28 October and commenced provisioning warships of the 3rd Fleet. The ship was damaged there by the November 1944 USS Mount Hood (AE-11) explosion. After emptying her holds, the vessel took on more cargo and weighed anchor on 10 December. She made Ulithi five days later and began unloading operations. The ship had completed this task by 7 January 1945 and, a week later, sailed for Guam. She unloaded cargo there and was back at Ulithi on 25 January. The vessel remained at the atoll conducting intraharbor cargo operations until 25 April. She then began preparations for the Battle of Leyte Gulf in the Philippines.

On 20 May, the ship set a course for San Pedro Bay. She arrived there on the 24th and commenced discharging her cargo. In mid-June, the vessel began taking on various equipment and supplies for transit to Ulithi. She got underway on 2 July, arrived back at Ulithi on the 8th, and was assigned duty as a station ship, her role through the end of hostilities on 15 August.

== After VJ Day ==
Aries left Ulithi on the 22nd and proceeded to Apra Harbor, Guam. There, she took on goods for shipment to Leyte. The vessel reached Philippine waters on 5 September and remained off Leyte engaged in cargo operations through early October. The vessel departed the area on the 7th and dropped anchor at Eniwetok 10 days later. After filling her cargo holds, she set a course for Japan, arrived in Tokyo Bay on 6 November, and began discharging her supplies in support of occupation forces ashore.

On 30 November, the cargo ship left Japanese waters and set a course for the United States. She paused en route at Midway on 11 December and finally reached San Francisco on the 24th. The ship then discharged all her cargo and ammunition in preparation for deactivation.

== Final disposition ==
She later moved to Oakland, California, where she was decommissioned on 28 March 1946. Her name was struck from the Navy list on 17 April 1946. The vessel was transferred to the Maritime Commission on 1 July 1946. She was sold on 5 May 1947 to Captain A. S. Oko for operation as a bulk carrier. She was scrapped in 1952.

== See also ==
- USS Menemsha (AG-39) sister ship in Navy
- USS Lake Pepin (ID 4215) sister ship in Navy in 1918
