= Rowing at the 1904 Summer Olympics – Men's single sculls =

Men's single sculls at the Games of the III Olympiad
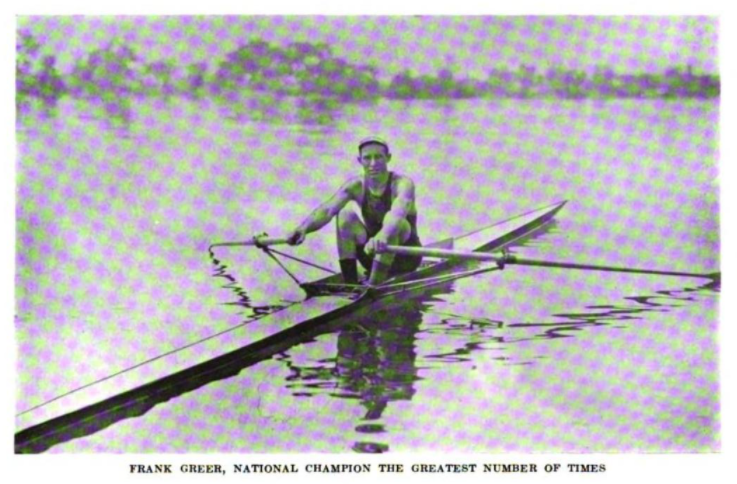
- Gold medalist Frank Greer (1923)
- Venue: Creve Coeur Lake
- Date: July 30, 1904
- Competitors: 4 from 1 nation
- Winning time: 10:08.5

Medalists
| 1st place, gold medalist(s) | | Frank Greer; United States |
| 2nd place, silver medalist(s) | | James Juvenal; United States |
| 3rd place, bronze medalist(s) | | Constance Titus; United States |

The men's single sculls was a rowing event held as part of the rowing programme at the 1904 Summer Olympics. It was the second time the event was held at the Olympics. The competition was held on Saturday, July 30, 1904. Four American rowers competed. Frank Greer won the event, with James Juvenal second and Constance Titus third. It was the only podium sweep in the history of the event, which restricted the number of boats per nation beginning in 1908.

== Background ==
This was the second appearance of the event. Rowing had been on the programme in 1896 but was cancelled due to bad weather. The single sculls has been held every time that rowing has been contested, beginning in 1900.

Two top scullers, James Ten Eyck of the United States and Lou Scholes of Canada, entered but withdrew before the race. Scholes had won the Henley Diamond Sculls earlier in 1904; he would eventually compete in the Olympics in 1908. The withdrawals left the race as a United States-only affair. The Americans who did compete included the 1902 and 1903 American champions (Constance Titus and Frank Greer).

The United States made its debut in the event, joining France, Great Britain, and Spain as nations who had competed once in the event.

== Competition format ==
The tournament featured a single race, with all four competitors rowing at the same time.

The distance for the race was 2 miles (3218 metres), rather than the 2000 metres which was becoming standard even at the time (and has been used in the Olympics since 1912, except in 1948). It was by far the longest distance used in the Games, over the 1.5 mile (2412 metres) course in London in 1908.

== Schedule ==
| Date | Time | Round |
|---|---|---|
| Saturday, 30 July 1904 | 17:10 | Final |

== Results ==
Greer won by two lengths over Juvenal, with Titus another half-length behind. Times are not known for rowers other than the winner.

| Rank | Rower | Nation | Time |
|---|---|---|---|
| 1st place, gold medalist(s) | Frank Greer | United States | 10:08.5 |
| 2nd place, silver medalist(s) | James Juvenal | United States | Unknown |
| 3rd place, bronze medalist(s) | Constance Titus | United States | Unknown |
| 4 | Divie Duffield | United States | Unknown |
