= Constance Titus =

American rower

Olympic medal record

Men's rowing
Bronze medal – third place	1904 St. Louis	single sculls

Constance Sutton Titus (August 14, 1873 – August 24, 1967) was an American rower who competed in the 1904 Summer Olympics. In 1904 he won the bronze medal in the single sculls.

Sporting positions
Preceded by Edward Hanlan Ten Eyck	National Association of Amateur Oarsmen Championship Single Sculls; 1902–1903	Succeeded by Frank Greer
Preceded by Frank Greer	National Association of Amateur Oarsmen Championship Single Sculls; 1906	Succeeded by Harry S. Bennett
