= Julius H. Barnes =

American businessman (1873–1959)

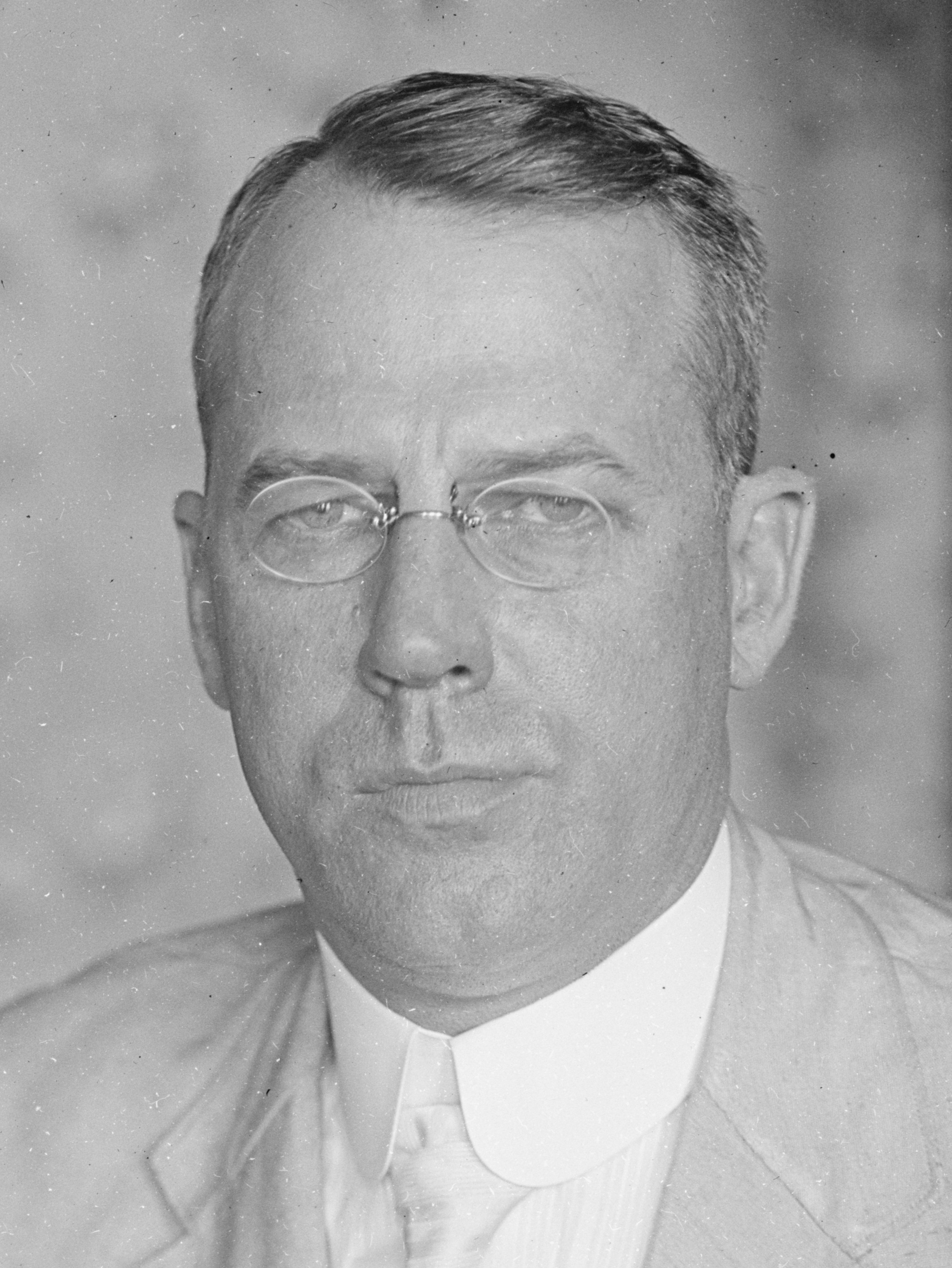
- Julius Barnes in 1917
- Born: Julius Howland Barnes; February 2, 1873; Little Rock, Arkansas, U.S.
- Died: April 17, 1959 (aged 86); Duluth, Minnesota, U.S.
- Resting place: Forest Hill Cemetery
- Political party: Republican

Julius Howland Barnes (February 2, 1873 – April 17, 1959) was an American industrialist and government official who served as chairman and president of the United States Chamber of Commerce. He played a role in the United States Food Administration during World War I, heading its grain division. He owned Barnes-Duluth Shipbuilding Company in Duluth, Minnesota.

== Early life ==
Julius Howland Barnes was born on February 2, 1873, in Little Rock, Arkansas, to Julia Matilda Hill and Lucien Jerome Barnes. In 1874, the family moved to Minnesota and later Washington, D.C. In 1883, his family moved to Duluth, Minnesota. His father died in his first semester of high school and he left school to support his family.

== Career ==
Barnes began working as an office boy at Ward Ames, a grain brokerage firm in Duluth. He would later become a partner of the firm.

In 1917, Barnes led the grain division of the United States Food Administration under Herbert Hoover. He was the U.S. Wheat Director in 1919. He was president of the United States Chamber of Commerce from 1921 to 1924. He was involved in several businesses, including the Barnes–Ames grain brokerage firm, the Barnes-Duluth Shipbuilding Company and the McDougall–Duluth Company. After 25 years of experimentation, he developed a process to manufacture yarn for rug making using flax straw from seed flax. This process led to the company Klearflax Linen Looms. He served as chairman of the company and it survived into the 1950s. He also served as chairman of the Erie and Saint Lawrence Corporation at New York. He operated a fleet of freighters in the Great Lakes, Erie Canal and the Atlantic Ocean.

After World War I, alongside Hoover, Barnes helped with the European relief program. He was a member of the Republican Party and wrote pamphlets, including "Which Way: Americanism or Communism". Barnes was featured on the May 5, 1930 cover of TIME Magazine.

== Personal life ==
Barnes had at least two children, Robert L. and Gertrude.

Barnes died on April 17, 1959, aged 86, at a hotel in Duluth, Minnesota. He is buried in Forest Hill Cemetery.

== Legacy ==
The Julius H. Barnes Points Trophy, a rowing award, bears his name.
