= USS Robert L. Barnes =

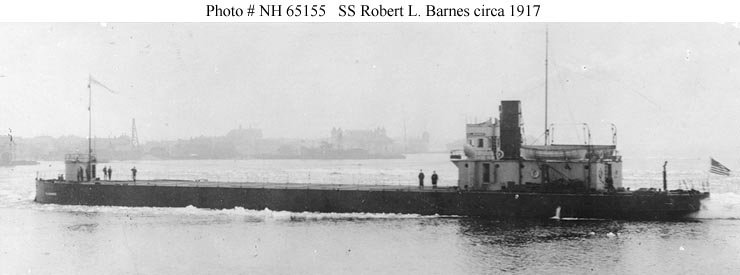
- SS Robert L. Barnes underway circa 1917, before acquisition by the Navy

History

United States
- Name: USS Robert L. Barnes
- Builder: McDougall Duluth Shipbuilding Company, Duluth, Minnesota
- Cost: $545,000 (hull and machinery)
- Acquired: 29 June 1918
- Commissioned: 19 October 1918
- Stricken: 24 July 1942
- Captured: 10 December 1941 by Japanese forces
- Fate: Sold to a British mercantile interest, renamed Fortune and M.T.S. No. 2 from 1945 to 1949, scrapped in 1950

General characteristics
- Class & type: none
- Type: Oiler
- Displacement: 1,630 long tons (lt) 3,850 long tons (fl)
- Length: 258 ft 6 in (78.79 m)
- Beam: 43 ft 2 in (13.16 m)
- Draft: 15 ft (4.6 m) (max)
- Propulsion: two single ended boilers, one vertical reciprocating steam engine, single propeller
- Speed: 8.5 knots (15.7 km/h; 9.8 mph)
- Capacity: 1,900 t.
- Complement: 1 Officer, 3 Chief Petty Officers, 50 Enlisted

USS Robert L. Barnes (AO-14) was an oiler in the United States Navy.

Robert L. Barnes was a steel tanker built during 1917 by McDougall Duluth Ship Building Company, Duluth, Minnesota, for the Robert Barnes Steam Ship Co.. Alexander McDougall built her as a prototype "rectangular ship" or "sea-going canal boat," with a plain, low hull and a superstructure that could be removed to pass under canal bridges. The ship was visually very similar to a Whaleback, also designed by McDougall. She was acquired from her builder by the U.S. Shipping Board on 29 June 1918; transferred to the U.S. Navy the same day; and commissioned at New York 19 October 1918. She remained in custody of the 3d Naval District while preparing for sea. Lt. G. C. Daniels assumed command on 29 January 1919.

Assigned to the 5th Naval District at Norfolk, Robert L. Barnes departed New York 12 March 1919 for Hampton Roads. Subsequently, she operated out of Guantanamo Bay, Cuba, and New York until returning to Norfolk 18 April 1919. The ship remained inactive at Norfolk and was undergoing overhaul 4 September 1919 when she was assigned to the Naval Overseas Transportation Service. She departed Norfolk 21 November for San Pedro, California, via the Panama Canal and San Diego, California After transporting diesel fuel to Pearl Harbor, the tanker departed Hawaii 8 April 1920 with fuel oil for Guam.

Arriving at Apra Harbor, on 27 April, Robert L. Barnes served as an oil storage vessel in Apra Harbor. The ship remained at Guam through the interwar decades, departing only in 1920, 1921, 1922, 1923, 1930, and 1934 under tow for Cavite Naval Base, Philippine Islands, for overhaul.

Robert L. Barnes was still in service at Guam on the outbreak of World War II in the Pacific. During Japanese air attacks on the island, 8 December 1941, the oiler was bombed and strafed at her mooring, causing damage topside and starting dangerous leaks. Still afloat when the Japanese invasion force landed on Guam, Robert L. Barnes was abandoned and fell into enemy hands 10 December 1941. She was renamed Hasu Maru. It was struck from the Navy list on 24 July 1942. Subsequently taken into Japanese service, the Robert L. Barnes was recovered at the end of the war. It was then sold to British mercantile interests, where she served as Fortune and M.T.S. No. 2 from 1945 to 1949 before she finally was scrapped in 1950.

== Awards ==
- World War I Victory Medal
- American Defense Service Medal
- Asiatic-Pacific Campaign Medal with one battle star
- World War II Victory Medal
