= Divie Duffield =

American rower

- c. 1918

Personal information
- Full name: Divie Bethune Duffield
- Born: March 3, 1870 Detroit, Michigan, United States
- Died: July 14, 1935 (aged 65) Detroit, Michigan, United States

Sport
- Sport: Rowing

Divie Bethune Duffield (March 3, 1870 – July 14, 1935) was an American rower. He competed in the men's single sculls event at the 1904 Summer Olympics.

== Biography ==
At Harvard, c. 1893

Divie Duffield was born in Detroit on March 3, 1870. He attended Phillips Exeter Academy and Harvard College, then earned a law degree from the Detroit College of Law.

In addition to working as a lawyer, he continued to compete in rowing, curling, and golf.

He died at Harper Hospital in Detroit on July 14, 1935.
