= McDougall Duluth Shipbuilding Company =

Shipyard in Duluth, Minnesota, United States

Coordinates: 46.707072°N 92.204127°W

Map of Duluth port on western Lake Superior

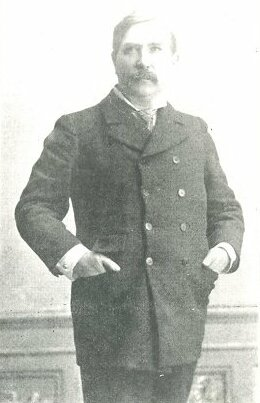
Alexander McDougall in 1919

The McDougall Duluth Shipbuilding Company was a large-scale wartime ship manufacturing shipyard, located at the city of Riverside, near Duluth. McDougall Duluth Shipbuilding was at 110 Spring Street, Duluth, Minnesota, now the site of the West Duluth's Spirit Lake Marina. The shipyard was located on St. Louis River Estuary at western part of Lake Superior. McDougall Duluth Shipbuilding Company was founded by Alexander McDougall (1845–1923) in 1917 to build ships for World War I. McDougall Duluth Shipbuilding Company and the Superior Shipbuilding Company (now Fraser Shipyards) were called the Twin Ports shipbuilding industry of Minnesota and Wisconsin. Once built the ships can travel to the Atlantic Ocean through the Great Lakes and the Saint Lawrence Seaway.

== History ==
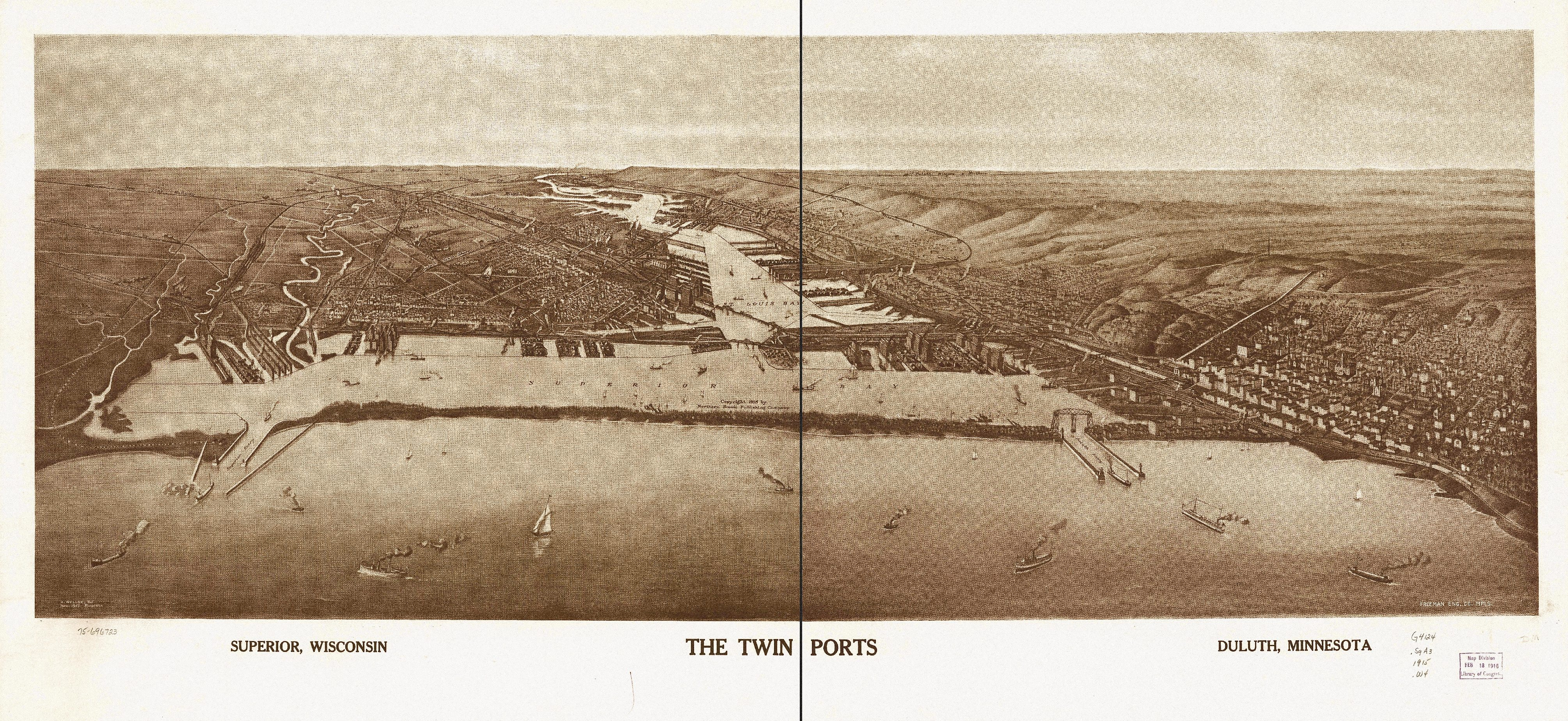
1915 Panoramic map of the Twin Ports, Superior on the left and Duluth on the right, by Henry Wellge

In 1890 iron ore was discovered on the Mesabi Range, this turned Duluth into a major shipping port. Duluth Works and other steel plants opened. The supply of steel opened western Duluth to shipbuilding. Before McDougall Duluth Shipbuilding Company opened in 1917, Alexander McDougall built 7 whaleback barges of his own new design in Duluth starting in 1887. With the success of the whaleback barge, Alexander McDougall opened the first shipyard on Lake Superior, (were Fraser Shipyards is now) in December 1891, that built whalebacks, like the Model 101, and steamships used for bulk cargo and passenger ships on the Great Lakes. His company was the American Steel Barge Company, which he sold in 1900 and became the Superior Shipbuilding Company, later this became the Knudsen Brothers Shipbuilding & Dry Dock Company and in 1955 the Fraser Shipyards. Samples of Alexander McDougall whalebacks:

- SS Thomas Wilson
- SS Charles W. Wetmore
- SS Christopher Columbus

=== McDougall Duluth Shipbuilding Company ===
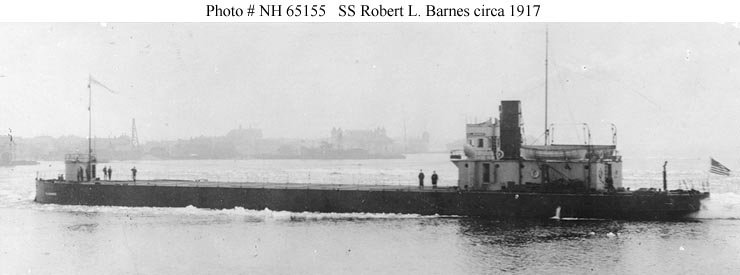
McDougall Duluth's first US Navy ship USS Robert L. Barnes (AO-14)

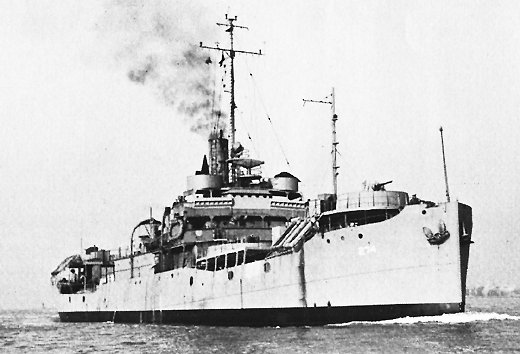
McDougall Duluth's USS Menemsha (AG-39), built as SS Lake Orange

Alexander McDougall opened the McDougall Duluth Shipbuilding Company due to the demand for ships for World War I. The new McDougall Duluth Shipyard was 6 miles west of his former yard on Lake Superior. Due to the growing steel and ship industries, many immigrates came to Duluth. The West Duluth riverfront had two large companies and company towns: U.S. Steel Works's city of Morgan Park that opened in 1913 and McDougall's city of Riverside that opened in 1917, with 3,000 living there. Riverside had for its workers an 800-seat theater, hospital, clubhouse, general store, monthly newspaper Riverside Review and boathouse. The town's school open in 1920 and closed in 1982. Alexander McDougall's son, Alexander Miller McDougall (1884–1951), and Julius H. Barnes did the day-to-day running of the town and shipyard. In 1922 Barnes also became the president of the U. S. Chamber of Commerce.

Some of ships built at McDougall Duluth Shipbuilding Company:

1918 Oiler tanker

- USS Robert L. Barnes (AO-14) 1917–1918

1918 Coal ships for World War I:

Private contracts:

- The USS Lakemoor or USS Lake Moor (Hull # 2 ID-215770) was torpedoed and sank on April 11, 1918, on maiden voyage as Navy coal ship (ID 2180), during World War I by U-boat SM UB-64 in the Irish Sea, off Corsewall Lighthouse, Scotland. Lost were 46 crew members. Ship named after Lakemoor, Illinois.
- The USS Lake Traverse (ID-2782) (Hull #3) (21615), Navy coal ship 1918–1919, In 1925 operated as private ship, took on water due steel plate failure and sank near Tortuga Island, Haiti in the Caribbean on July 6, 1955. Ordered as SS War Centaur, name changed before delivery in April 1918. Named after Lake Traverse.

War contracts:

- USS Lake Pepin
- USS Lake Orange
- USS Lake Geneva
- The USS Lake Portage (Hull# 4) (216409) was torpedoed and sank on August 3, 1918, during World War I by SM UB-88 just south of Audierne, France. Lost were three crew members and six with burns.
- The USS Lake Indian (ID-4215-A) (216990), no Navy service, took on water and sank on January 25, 1927, near Sand Key Light, Florida.
- SS Lake Markham (Hull # 5 ID 216587, ID-4215-C) ordered as SS Allette, no Navy service, SS Chicago in 1927, scrapped in 1937.
- SS Lake Helen (Hull # 8 ID 216892) ordered as, before delivery SS Macon. Renamed SS York in 1926, SS Skogak in 1929, SS Kama in 1933, and scrapped in 1970

1919 Cargo ships 3,600 DTW: Emergency Fleet ship

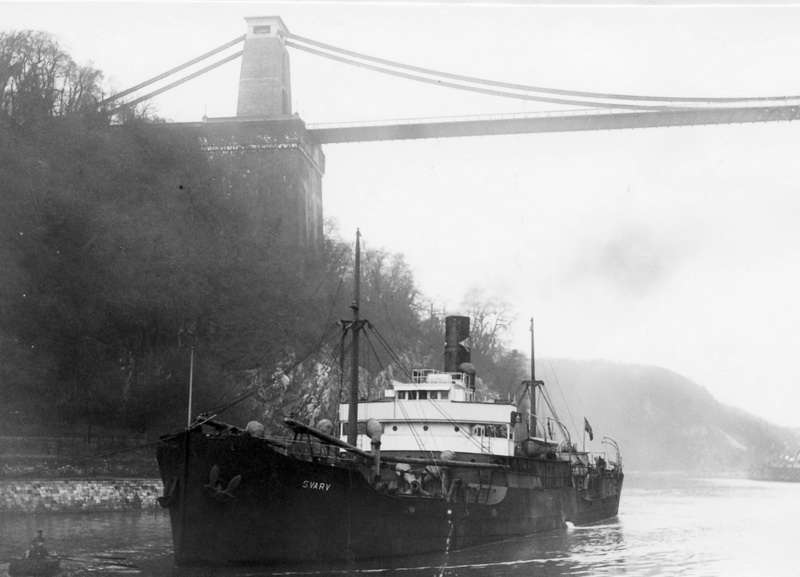
McDougall Duluth's 3,600 DTW 1919 SS Ceralvo, sank in Black Sea on November 28, 1941

- Cedar Spring
- Ceralvo (wrecked 1941)
- Cerosco
- Cerro Gordo
- Chamberino (wrecked 1952)
- Chamblee (sunk by mine 1945)
- Chaperel
- Chantier (sunk 1933)
- Chappell (bombed and sunk 1943)
- Chautauqua (wrecked 1948)

1919-1920 Cargo ships 4,145 DTW:

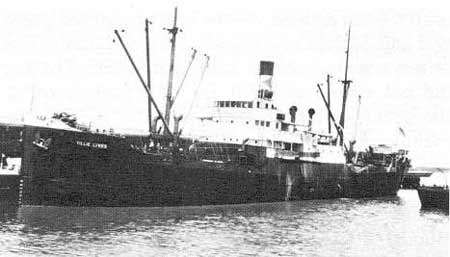
SS Lake Florian/SS Tillie Lykes 1920, 4,145 DTW, torpedoed and sank in 1942

- Lake Flagon
- Lake Flagstaff (torpedoed and sunk 1942)
- Lake Flambeau (torpedoed and sunk 1942)
- Lake Flanders (sunk 1930)
- Lake Flatonia
- Lake Flattery (torpedoed sank 1942)
- Lake Strymon
- La Crosse
- Fargo
- Sioux Falls
- Great Falls (wrecked 1942)
- Lake Floravista (wrecked 1952)
- Lake Florian (torpedoed and sunk 1942)
- Lake Floris (torpedoed and sunk 1942)
- Lake Flournoy (torpedoed and sunk 1942)

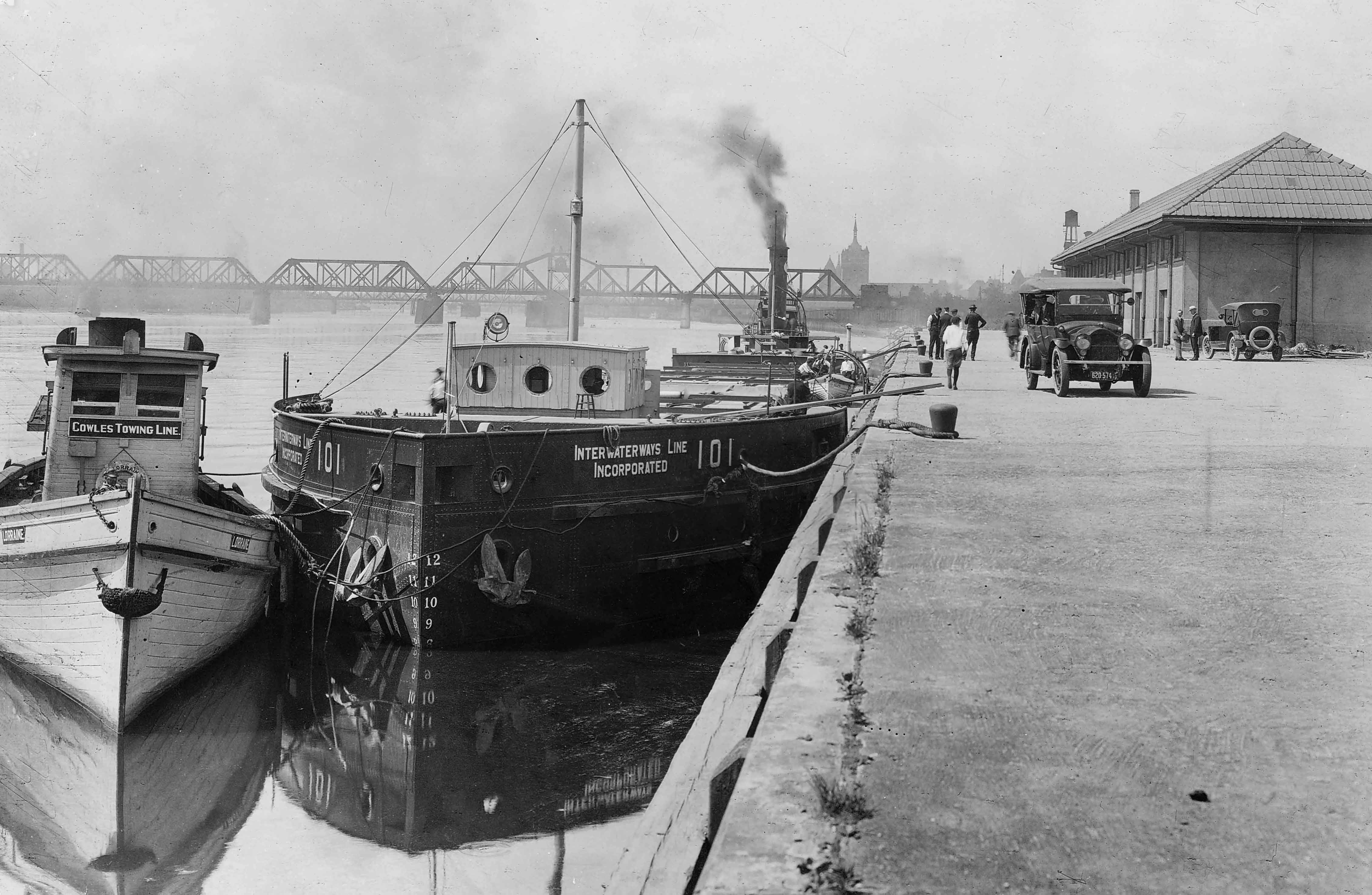
Day Peckinpaugh at Albany's Corning in 1921

Frederickstads type ship for private owners:

1920 Tanker 2417 DWT

- Theodore F. Reynolds (sunk)
- Julius Kessler
- Philip Publicker

1920 Cargo 3,350 DWT:

- Josefa
- Antonio (torpedoed and sunk 1942)

Canal motorship 1921 1,040 DWT, for New York State Barge Canal

- SS Day Peckinpaugh / I.L.I. 101, May 1921. now museum ship
- I.L.I. 102, May 1921.
- I.L.I. 103, May 1921.
- I.L.I. 104, May 1921.
- I.L.I. 105, July 1921 (Hull # 45, last McDougall Duluth ship)

=== Barnes-Duluth Shipbuilding ===
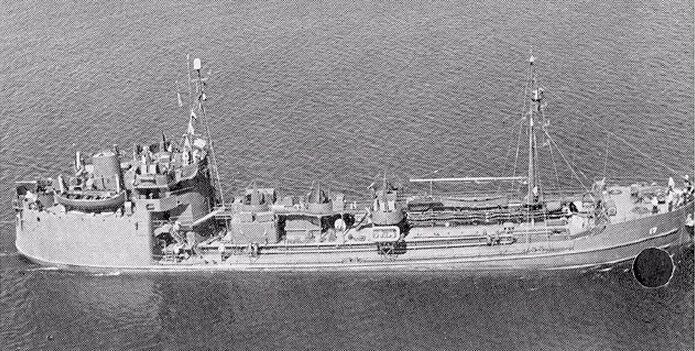
Coastal tanker, T1-M-A1 tanker

Julius H. Barnes purchased the shipyard from McDougall in 1922 and renamed it Barnes-Duluth Shipbuilding. The shipyard continued to build private ships between the world wars. For World War II the yard built fully outfitted warships. Some of Barnes-Duluth Shipbuilding ships:

Coastal tanker In 1943 Barnes-Duluth built 12 T1-M-A1 tanker also called a small a Coastal tanker. The tanker was diesel-powered with: 800 hp, 10 knots max. Tonnage Deadweight: 1,600, Tonnage Full Load: 2,900, Dimensions: 221 feet long, Width 37 ft. The 12 ships were loaned to Britain under Lease/ Lend terms.

- Tarentum (Hull # 1, May 1943)
- Titusville
- Mannington
- Salt Creek
- Glen Pool
- Jennings
- Tonkawa
- Cromwell
- Benton Field
- Rio Bravo (torpedoed and sunk 1942)
- Walnut Bend
- Loma Novia

Lake tankers, 3,401 DWT built in 1943:

- Carpito
- San Joaquin (wrecked 1960)
- Temblador
- San Cristobal (sunk 1965)
- Guarico
- Guiria
- Valera (torpedoed and sunk 1944)

Cargo ship type N3-S-A2 2,757 DWT, built in 1944:

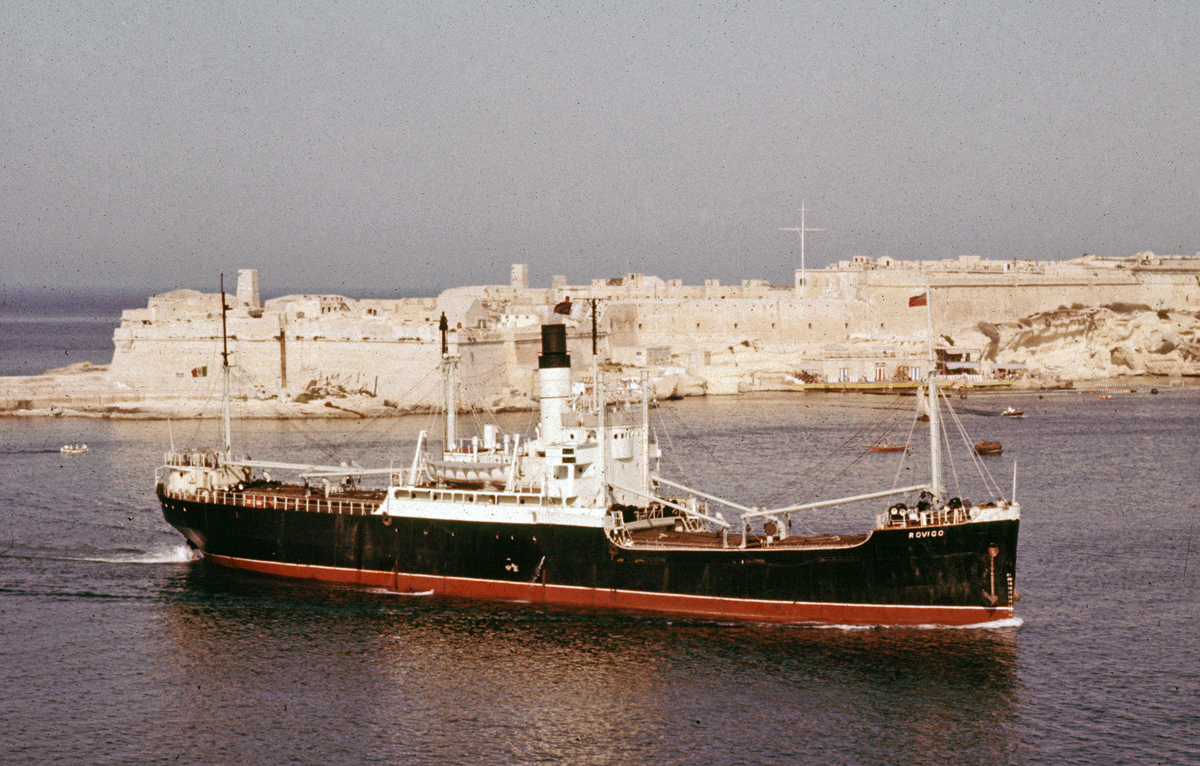
Cargo ship type N3-S-A2 built in 1944

- David R. Le Craw (Sunk 1958)
- James Miller
- Samuel Samuels (Sunk 1965)
- Joseph Hamilton
- John D. Whidden
- George W. Brown
- George Crocker
- Frank Dale (June 1944, Hull # 27, last Barnes-Duluth ship)

=== Walter Butler Shipbuilders ===
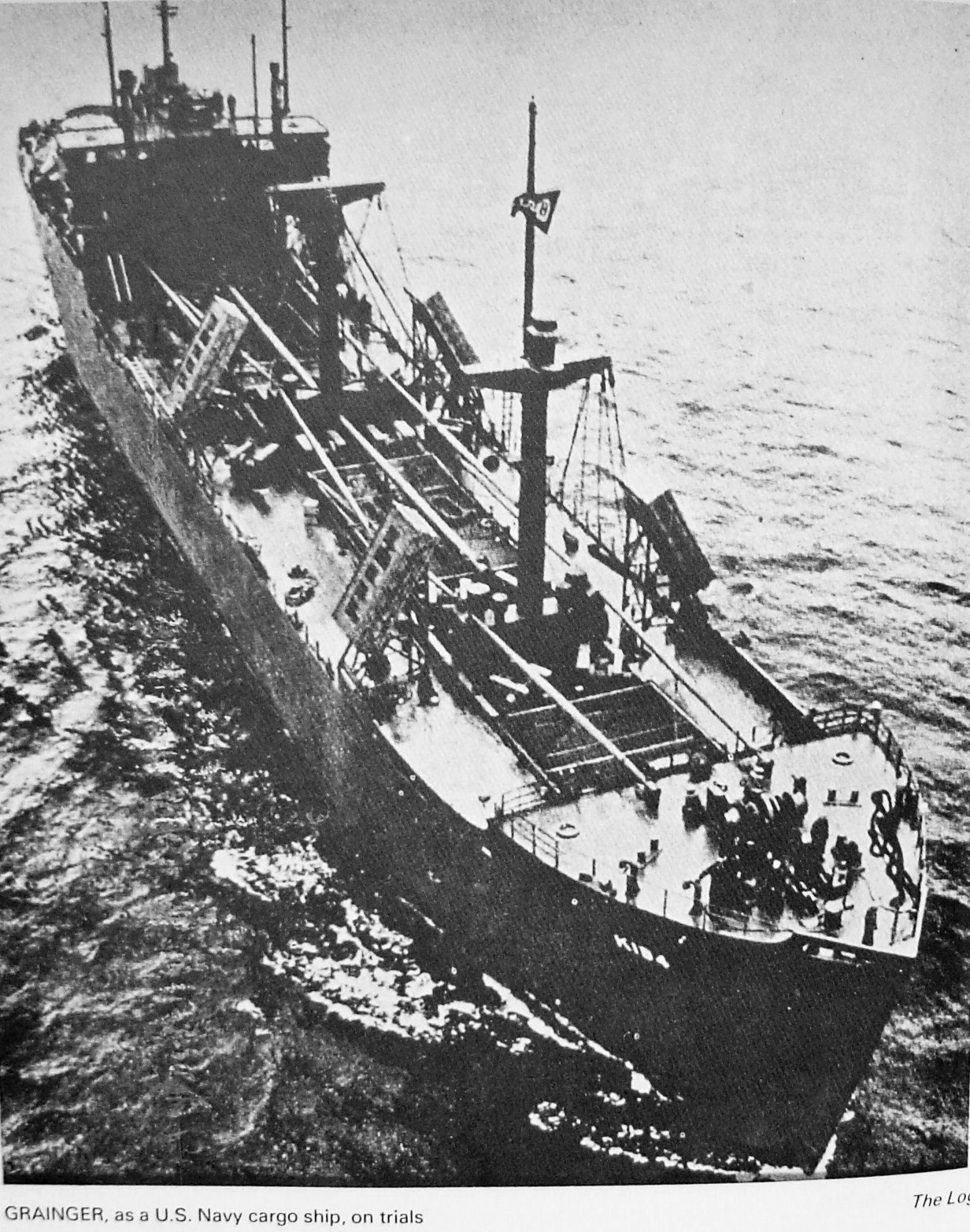
USS Grainger (AK-184) departing Walter Butler Shipbuilders in 1944

Walter Butler purchased the shipyard from Barnes in 1943 and renamed it Walter Butler Shipbuilders. For World War II Walter Butler Shipbuilders Duluth built under the Emergency Shipbuilding Program C1-M type ships. The Duluth yard closed in 1945, as all war contacts ended and there was a surplus of ships at the end of the war. Walter Butler also had a shipyard in Superior, Wisconsin from 1942 to 1945 for building warships. Walter Butler shipbuilding was a family company started in 1877 as the Butler Brothers Shipbuilders, then Walter Butler Shipbuilders Inc. the brother pass the yard to Robert Butler (1897–1955).

Some of Walter Butler Shipbuilders Duluth ships:

C1-M-AV1 cargo ships, 2239 tons, 3,805 DWT:

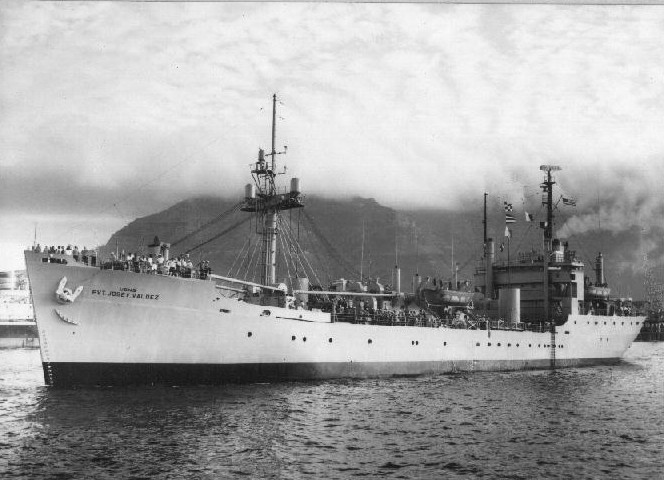
Walter Butler Shipbuilders' USNS Private Jose F. Valdez (T-AG-169)

- Cape Somerset (Hull # 328, August 1944)
- Cape Stanhope
- Elmer J. Burr (wrecked 1946)
- William G. Fournier
- Kenneth E. Gruennert (wrecked 1953)
- Lewis Hall
- Joe P. Martinez
- William N. Nelson
- Alexander R. Nininger, Jr.
- Roband Hitch
- Harold W. Roberts
- Honda Knot
- Shamrock Knot
- Fiador Knot
- Lever's Bend
- Manrope Knot
- SS Marline Hitch
- Mainsheet Eye (Hull # 345, August 1945, last Walter Butler Duluth ship)

=== Spirit Lake Marina ===
The current site is the Spirit Lake Marina, also called West Duluth Marina, which has docks and berths for recreational boats on the river and lake. Today there are only two buildings left standing from the original shipyard campus of over two dozen buildings.

=== Symphony Boat Company ===
In 2014, commercial boat building started again, Symphony Boat Company is building recreational boats at the marina. The shipyard is active for the first time since 1945.

== Gallery ==
- Panel photos of McDougall Duluth Shipbuilding Company in 1918:

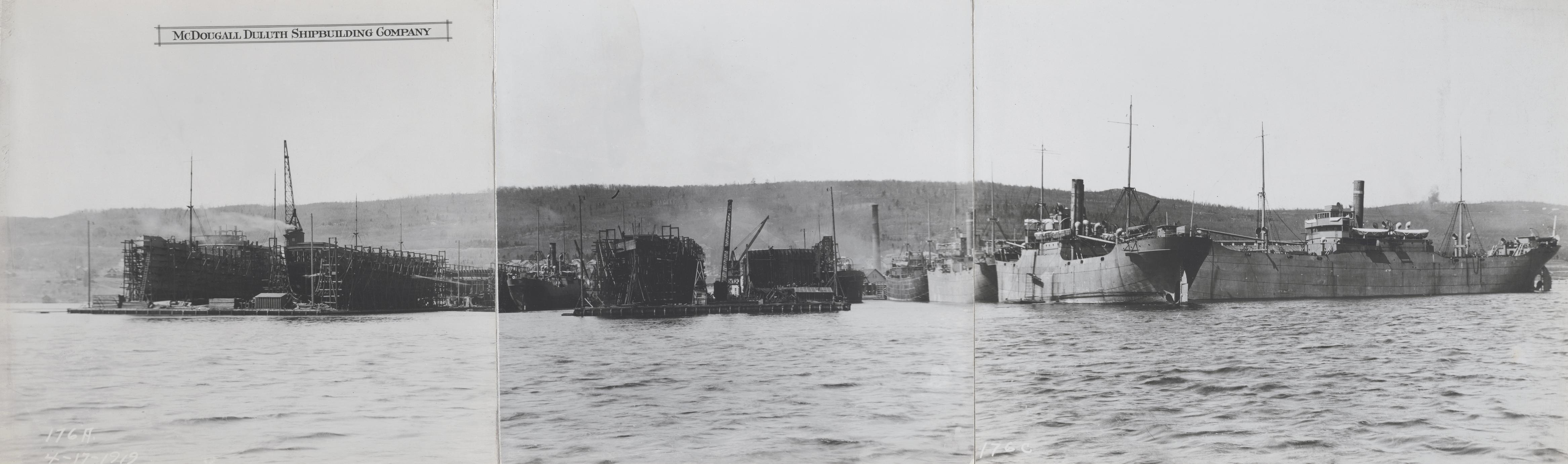
McDougall Duluth Shipyard in 1919, from river

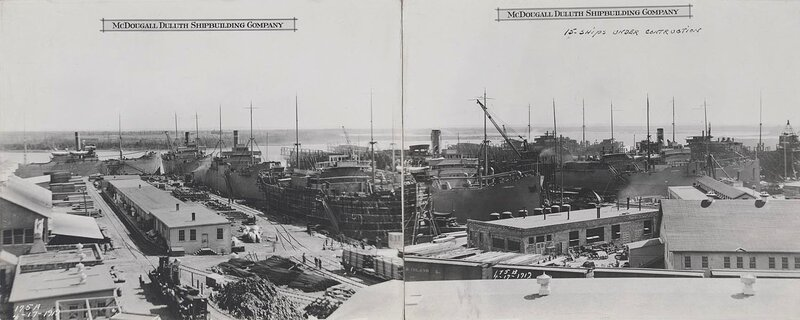
McDougallMcDougall Duluth Shipyard in 1919, from Riverside

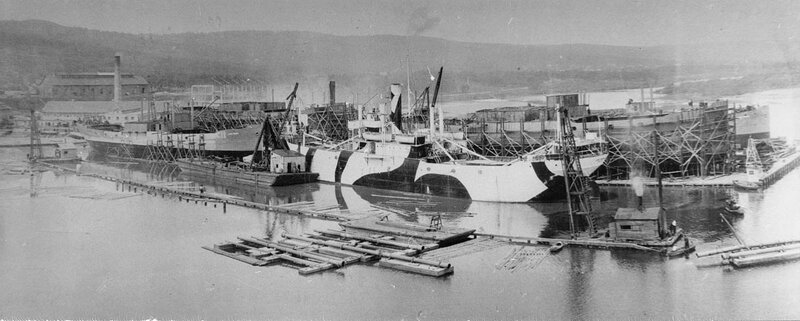
McDougall Duluth Shipyard in 1919, from river

- Riverside Company Town Band and Baseball team in 1918, workers of the McDougall Duluth Shipbuilding Company. The band played noon lunchtime concerts during the workweek and played at the 1919 Minnesota State Fair. Riverside Company Town had two baseball teams: The Cubs of the shipyard and the Giants from the iron works from US steel.

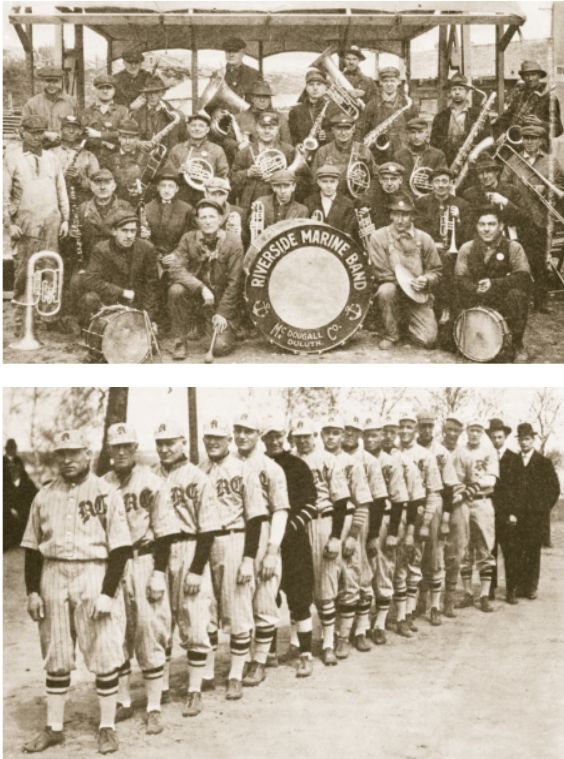
Riverside Company Town Band and Baseball team in 1918

- Map of Riverside company town in 1918 and the McDougall Duluth Shipbuilding shipyard:

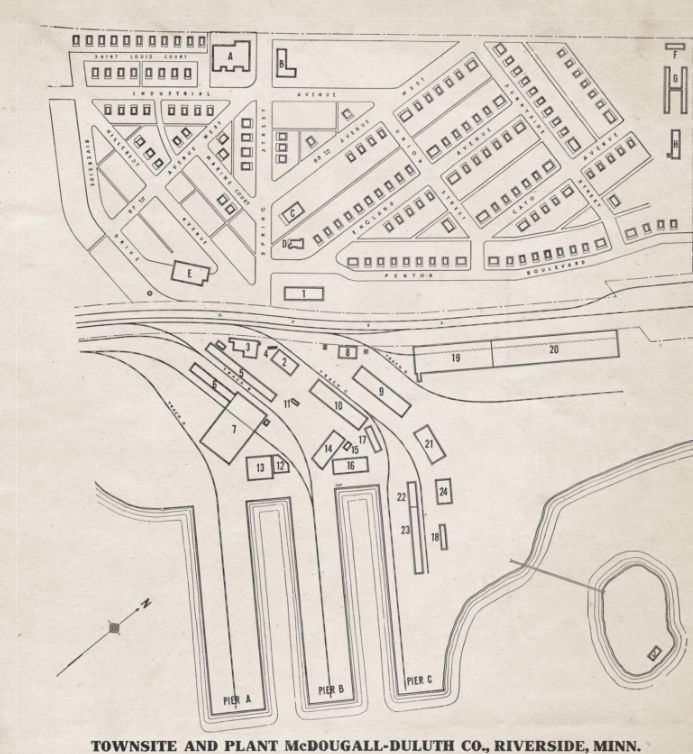
Map Riverside company town in 1918 and the shipyard of McDougall Duluth Shipbuilding

Julius H. Barnes, owner of Barnes-Duluth Shipbuilding from 1922 to 1943

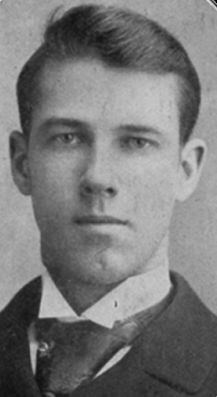
JuliusHBarnes

== See also ==
- Great Lakes Engineering Works
- Collingwood Shipbuilding Company
- Defoe Shipbuilding Company
- Manitowoc Shipbuilding Company
- American Ship Building Company
- Attack on Pearl Harbor
