= National Association of Amateur Oarsmen =

Governing body of the sport of rowing

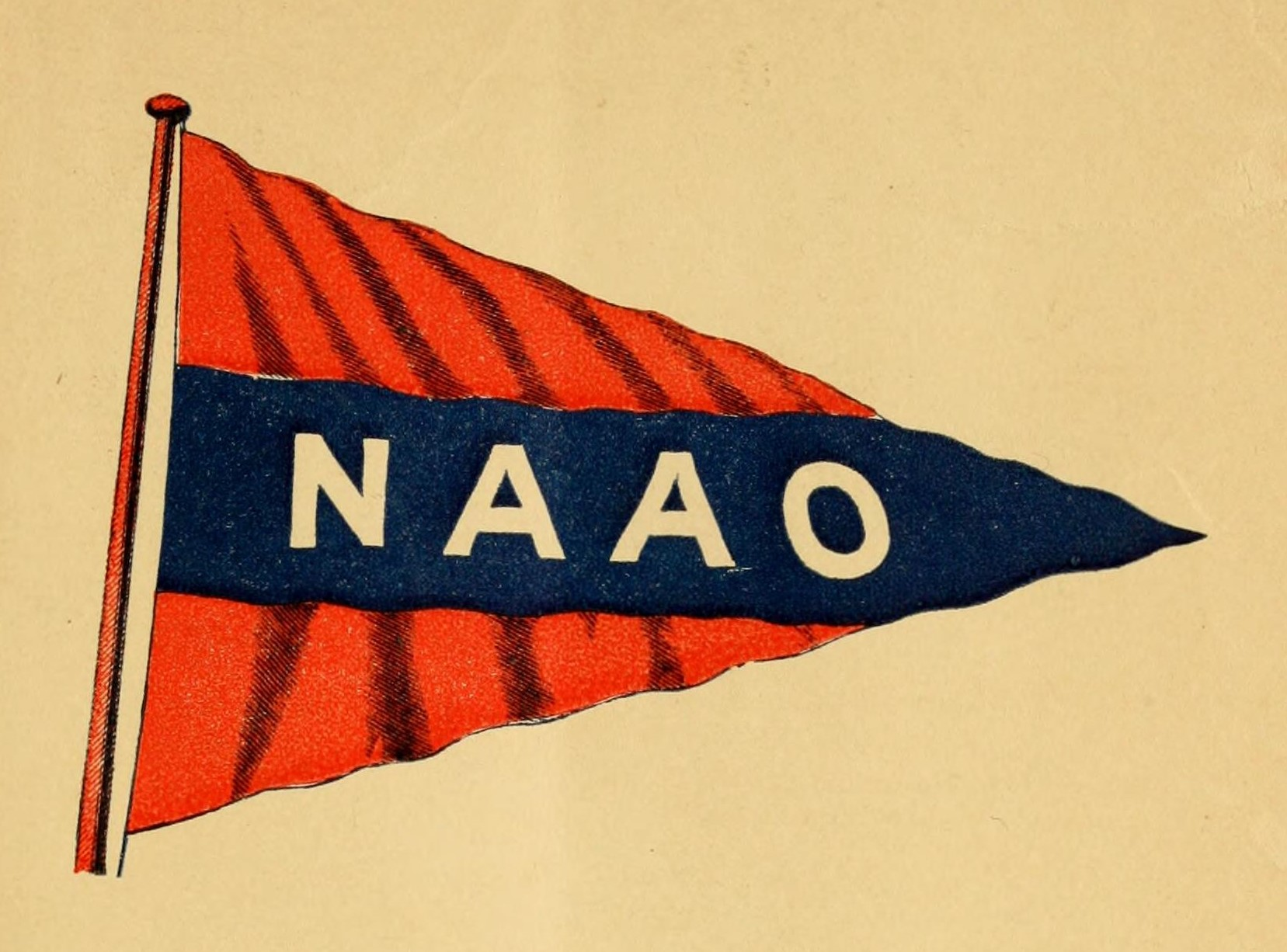
The association's flag

The National Association of Amateur Oarsmen, organized in 1872, was the first national governing body of the sport of rowing in the United States, and the first American sports organization to publish a definition of "amateur". Before the NAAO, regattas across the country used different definitions of amateur, making it impossible to hold a national amateur championship regatta. The NAAO's first national championship regatta was held in 1873 on the Schuylkill River in Philadelphia. Beginning in 1916, the Julius H. Barnes Points Trophy was awarded to the club scoring the most points over the course of the championship regatta.

In 1982, the NAAO was merged with the National Women's Rowing Association to form the United States Rowing Association.

== National Championship Regattas ==
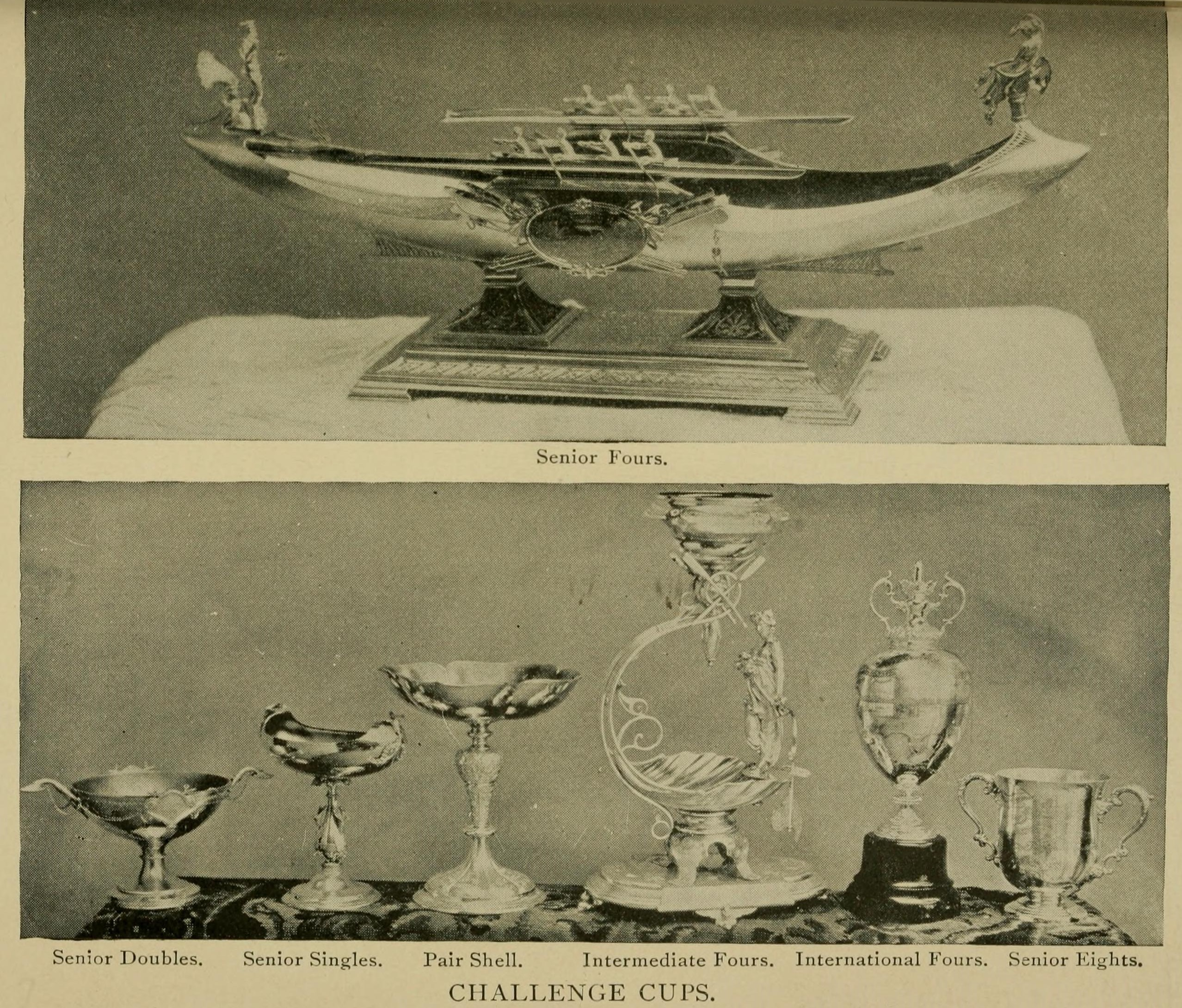
Awards presented to winners of the national championships

The following regattas were over one and one half miles (except the 1891 regatta in Washington, DC, which was one quarter mile)

| Year | City | Championship senior single sculls |
|---|---|---|
| 1873 | Philadelphia | Charles Meyers |
| 1874 | Troy, NY | Frank E. Yates |
| 1875 | Troy, NY | Charles E. Courtney |
| 1876 | Philadelphia | Frank E. Yates |
| 1877 | Detroit | George W. Lee |
| 1878 | Newark, NJ | George W. Lee |
| 1879 | Saratoga, NY | F.J. Mumford |
| 1880 | Philadelphia | F.J. Mumford |
| 1881 | Washington, DC | F.E. Holmes |
| 1882 | Detroit | F.E. Holmes |
| 1883 | Newark, NJ | John Laing |
| 1884 | Watkins, NY | John Laing |
| 1885 | Boston | Daniel J. Murphy |
| 1886 | Albany, NY | Martin F. Monahan |
| 1887 | Jamestown, NY | J.F. Corbett |
| 1888 | Sunbury, PA | C.G. Psotta |
| 1889 | Pullman, IL | D. Donohue |
| 1890 | Worcester, MA | William Caffrey |
| 1891 | Washington, DC | William Caffrey |
| 1892 | Saratoga, NY | John J. Ryan |
| 1893 | Detroit | John J. Ryan |
| 1894 | Saratoga, NY | Ferdinand Koenig |
| 1895 | Saratoga, NY | J.J. Whitehead |
| 1896 | Saratoga, NY | W.D. McDowell |
| 1897 | Philadelphia | Joseph Maguire |
| 1898 | Philadelphia | Edward Ten Eyck |
| 1899 | Boston | Edward Ten Eyck |
| 1900 | New York City | John Rumouhr |
| 1901 | Philadelphia | Edward Ten Eyck |
| 1902 | Worcester, MA | Constance Titus |
| 1903 | Worcester, MA | Constance Titus |
| 1904 | St. Louis, MO | Frank Greer |
| 1905 | Baltimore | Frank Greer |
| 1906 | Worcester, MA | Constance Titus |
| 1907 | Philadelphia | Harry S. Bennett |

== Additional reading ==
Spalding Athletic Library issued Official Rowing Guide in May 1896. Frederick R Fortmeyer (secretary of the National Association of Amateur Oarsmen) compiled the 86 page guide. It also includes laws governing the association.
