= Ten Eyck family =

Dutch-American family

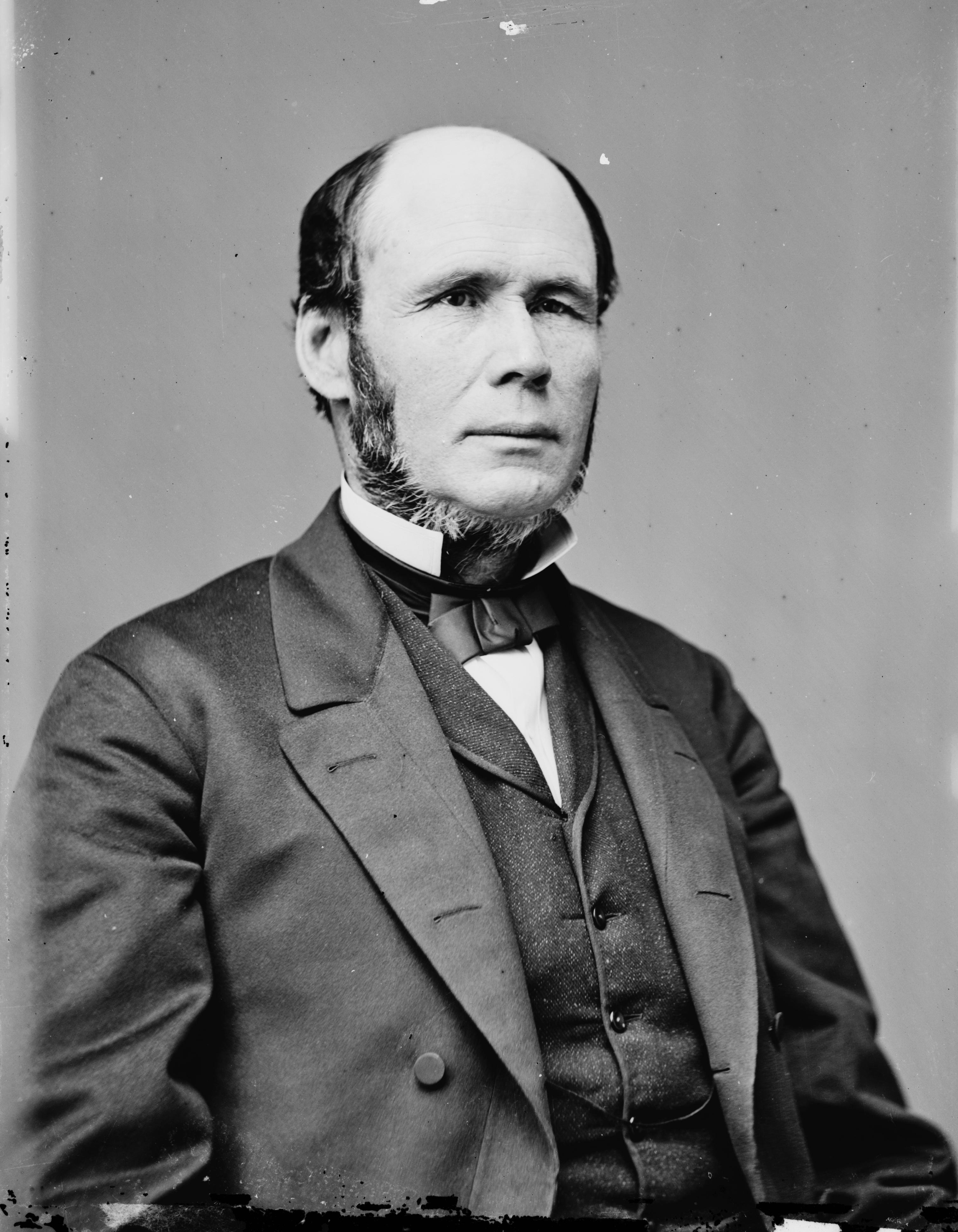
John Conover Ten Eyck, U.S. Senator from New Jersey during the American Civil War

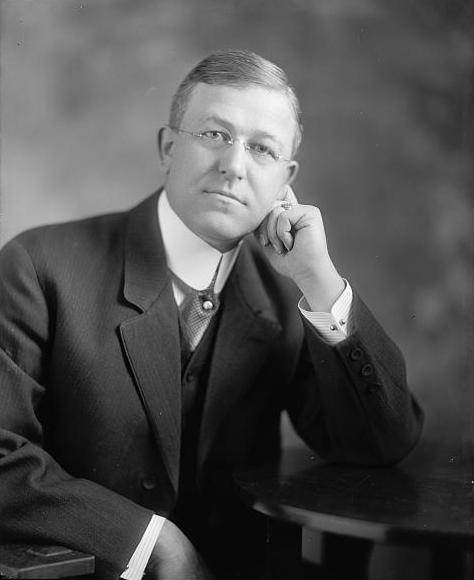
Peter Gansevoort Ten Eyck, U.S. Representative from New York

The Ten Eyck family came from the Netherlands to New Amsterdam (today's Manhattan) in the 1630s. The patriarch of the American branch of the family was Coenraedt Ten Eyck, who was originally from Moers. His son Jacob moved to Albany where he was a silversmith. Several family members gained land, wealth and positions of power in Albany, New York City and New Jersey. Their descendants served as Albany Mayor, New York State Senator, U.S. Representatives from New York, and U.S. Senator from New Jersey. The Ten Eycks also formed several businesses, including the Ten Eyck hotel and the Ten Eyck insurance group.

Many streets in the eastern United States, and especially the greater New York City metropolitan area, are named after the family.

== Family members ==
- Coenraedt Ten Eyck (1617–1686), who moved from the United Provinces to New Amsterdam about 1651. He was a shoemaker and a tanner and owned property in New Amsterdam.
- Jacob Coenraedtsen Ten Eyck (1647–1693), who moved from New York City to settle in Albany, son of Coenraedt.
- Coenraedt Ten Eyck II (1678–1753), an Albany silversmith.
- Jacob Coenraedt Ten Eyck (1705–1793), who served as Mayor of Albany in 1748.
- Jacob H. Ten Eyck (1708–1776), merchant who served as alderman and member of the New York General Assembly.
- Anthony E. Ten Eyck (1739–1816), a member of Constitutional Convention of 1787, judge of Rensselaer County, and member of the New York State Senate.
- Egbert Ten Eyck (1779–1844), U.S. Representative from New York.
- Coenraad Anthony Ten Eyck (1789–1845), Sheriff of Albany county and county clerk. Son of Anthony Ten Eyck
- John Conover Ten Eyck (1814–1879), U.S. Senator from New Jersey.
- Abraham Cuyler Ten Eyck (1830–1900), a "Forty-niner" in the California gold rush. Son of Coenraad Ten Eyck.
- James A. Ten Eyck (1851–1938), champion rower and coach, Ten Eyck Trophy namesake.
- Peter Gansevoort Ten Eyck (1873–1944), U.S. Representative from New York.
- John Adams Ten Eyck III (1893–1932), painter and etcher.
- Edward Ten Eyck (1879-1956), champion rower and coach, son of James A. Ten Eyck.
- Maude Edwards Ten Eyck (1902–1977), New York politician.
- Meg E. Ten Eyck (1987-Present), New York Entrepreneur

=== Jacob Coenraedt Ten Eyck (1705–1793) ===
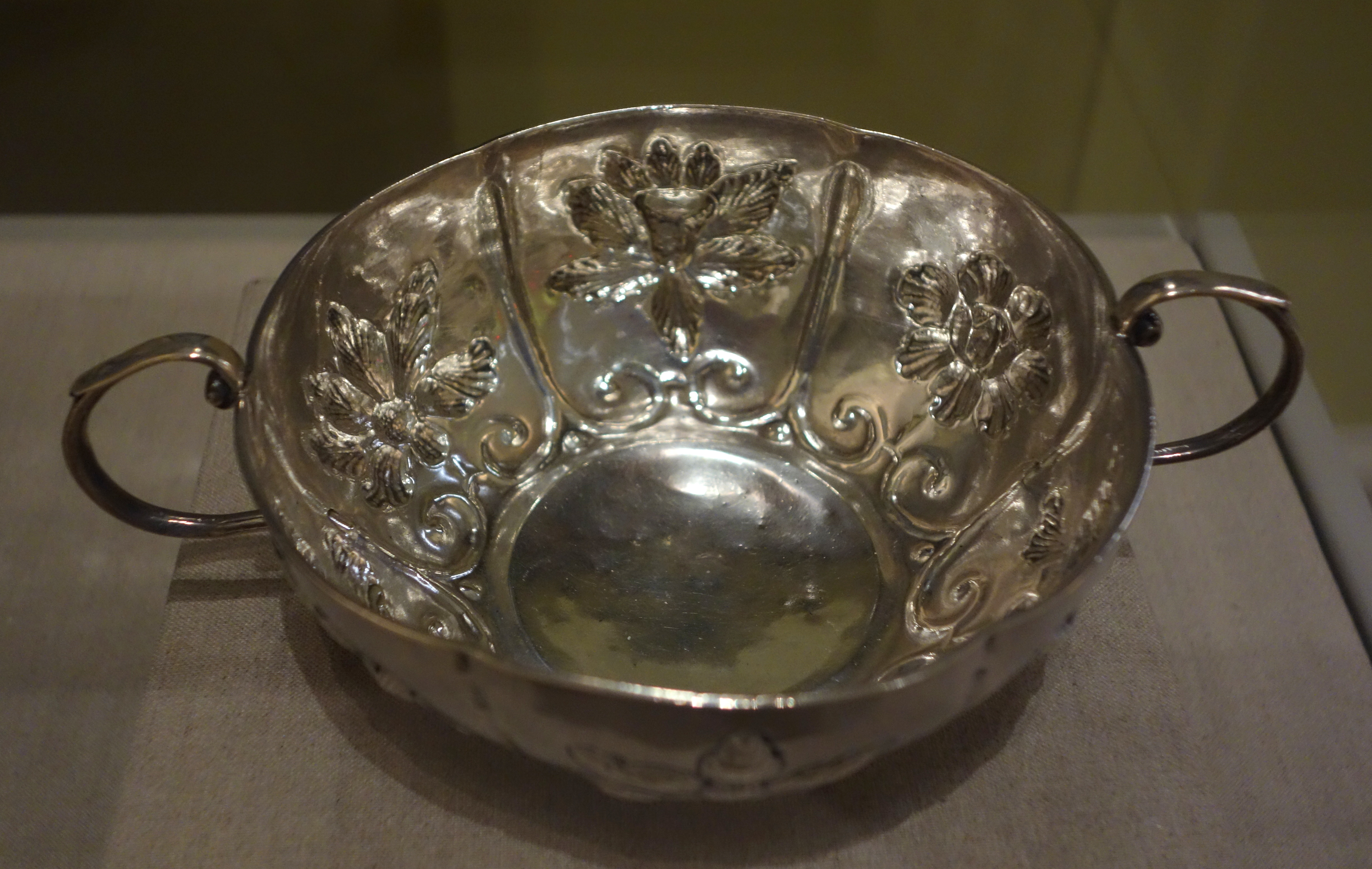
Paneled brandywine bowl (between 1730 and 1750), by Jacob Coenradt Ten Eyck

Jacob Coenraedt Ten Eyck was the son of Coenradt and Geertje Ten Eyck. At fifteen, he was apprenticing as a silversmith. He also served as a constable and Chief Fire Officer and, in 1734, was elected to the city council, first as an assistant and later in 1741 as an alderman for the first ward. He was appointed Sheriff of Albany county in 1747.

Jacob was elected mayor of Albany in 1748 and appointed by Colonial Governor George Clinton. He served as mayor for two years, from October 1748 to October 1750. In 1750, he was again elected alderman for the second ward and served as such until 1762. Other responsibilities he took on while working in politics include acting as the Commissioner of Indian Affairs (November 1752-June 1754) and as judge of the Court of Common Pleas. He was also an anti federalist who played a role in the American Revolution, acting as a member of the Committee of Safety, and signed a list, along with several other Albany anti federalists, opposing the ratification of the Federal Constitution in 1788.

Jacob married Catharina Cuyler in 1736 and together they had four children. He died on September 9, 1783.

=== Jacob Lansing Ten Eyck (1864–1942) ===
Jacob Lansing Ten Eyck was the son of Abraham and Margaret Ten Eyck, and he was born in Albany in 1864. He completed his childhood education in local schools, graduating from Albany high school in 1881. After high school he took on several different jobs, including time as a lumber dealer and a book seller.

Jacob took up an interest in politics and began to study in a law office and, while working for the Barber Asphalt Paving Company, convinced the law corporation to get asphalt pavement for their businesses in Albany, Troy, and Schenectady. He attended the Albany Law School of Union University and passed the bar in 1888. He became an assemblyman for Albany's Third district in 1895 later chairman of the Democratic city committee in 1900.

Jacob married Kate Dyer in September 1889 and they had one child. He died in Albany in 1942.

=== Peter Gansevoort Ten Eyck (1873–1944) ===
Peter Gansevoort Ten Eyck (brother to Jacob Lansing Ten Eyck) was born in the Gansevoort mansion in Albany, New York on November 7, 1873 to Abraham and Margaret Ten Eyck. His early years of schooling were spent at the Albany Academy for Boys, a preparatory school and he later gained entrance into the Rensselaer Polytechnic Institute of Troy to study civil engineering.

Peter worked with the superintendent of parks in the city of Albany to design the lay out Beaver Park. He later went on to work for the Mohawk division of the New York Central Railroad, first as an inspector of signals and later becoming the supervisor of signals. He eventually became the engineer of signals, which made him responsible for the construction, maintenance, and upkeep of all the railway signals on the Central Line. He worked in signal engineering for fifteen years, moving his employment from the New York Central railroad to the Federal Railway Signal company in 1903, of which he later became vice-president and general manager.

Peter was elected as a Democrat into the sixty-third Congress of the United States in March 1913, lasting only one term before losing his campaign for re-election to the sixty-fourth Congress in 1914. In 1920, he acted as a delegate the Democratic National Convention, and was reelected to the sixty-seventh Congress in March 1921. He declined the nomination to run for a second term in 1922.

Peter was active in many groups, including the Insurance Federation of the State of New York, as well as the American Institute of Electrical Engineers, the American Railway Engineering and Maintenance of Way Association, the Railway Signal Association, the Albany Institute and History and Art society and the Second Dutch Reformed Church. He founded the Ten Eyck Group Insurance Agency in 1905.

Peter married Bertha Dederick in 1903 and they had one child, Peter Gansevoort Dederick Ten Eyck, who took over as president of the firm after his father's death on September 2, 1944.

== Businesses ==
=== The Ten Eyck Hotel (1917–1971) ===
The construction of the Ten Eyck Hotel began in 1917 and the building was opened for business in 1918. The hotel was built at 83 State Street, on the corner of State and Pearl Street, in the place that used to be known as The Elm Tree Corner, a central crossroad in Albany. The Ten Eyck was a seventeen-story building that catered to the capital's elite and held a restaurant and oyster bar. In 1933, the hotel was operated by Niagara Falls businessman Frank A. Dudley and the United Hotels Company.

The hotel was bought and remodeled by Sheraton in the 1950s and lasted as a business until the late 1960s. The building was torn down in 1971, and later in that same decade, Ten Eyck Plaza was built in its place. The forty foot bar from the hotel was saved before demolition and relocated to The Depot Grille in Staunton, Virginia.

=== Ten Eyck Group ===
The Ten Eyck Group was established by Peter Gansevoort Ten Eyck in 1905. The Group is one of the oldest insurance firms in upstate New York and has changed both leadership and locations many times since its establishment. It was incorporated in 1932.

The company was headed by Peter G. Ten Eyck until his death in 1944, and his son Peter Gansevoort Dederick Ten Eyck became his successor. The company expanded under Peter G.D. Ten Eyck, and the first general manager was hired in the 1940s. Peter G.D.'s son John became president in 1974 and then passed the leadership to a non-Ten Eyck upon his retirement in 2002. The Ten Eyck group is located on Western Avenue in Albany, New York.
