= Julius H. Barnes Points Trophy =

The Sulger-Barnes Points Trophy, also historically known as the Julius H. Barnes Points Trophy, is a trophy originally awarded by the National Association of Amateur Oarsmen to the winning club of their national championship regatta, and which is now awarded to the winningest club or team at US Rowing’s National Championship . The was first awarded in 1916 at the regatta held in Duluth. It was valued at $4,000, equivalent to $118,349 in 2025. It is named after a wealthy grain exporter who bankrolled the regatta, and later was refurbished in honor of the Francis Sulger and John J. (“Jack”) Sulger of long-time winning teams from the New York Athletic Club. The scoring system was designed to be similar to that of the Lipton Cup, a trophy for sailing. As of 2017, the United States Rowing Association, successor to the NAAO, has the original Barnes trophy in their possession and occasionally displays it at events.

US Rowing continues to award the "Sulger-Barnes Men's Points Trophy" at their National Championships Regatta to the club with the most points in men's events. The scoring system used by the USRA for the Sulger-Barnes trophy and other points trophies is as follows. Identical or similar systems, often referred to as "Barnes scoring," are used in many American regattas.

Points for 1st place in grand final
Boat class	Points
1x	10
2x, 2-	15
4x, 4-, 4+	20
8+	30

% of 1st place points
# boats in final	2nd	3rd	4th	5th	6th
2	20%				
3	40%	20%			
4	60%	30%	5%		
5	80%	40%	10%		
6+	80%	40%	20%	10%	5%
