= Jim Ten Eyck Memorial Trophy =

Rowing Award

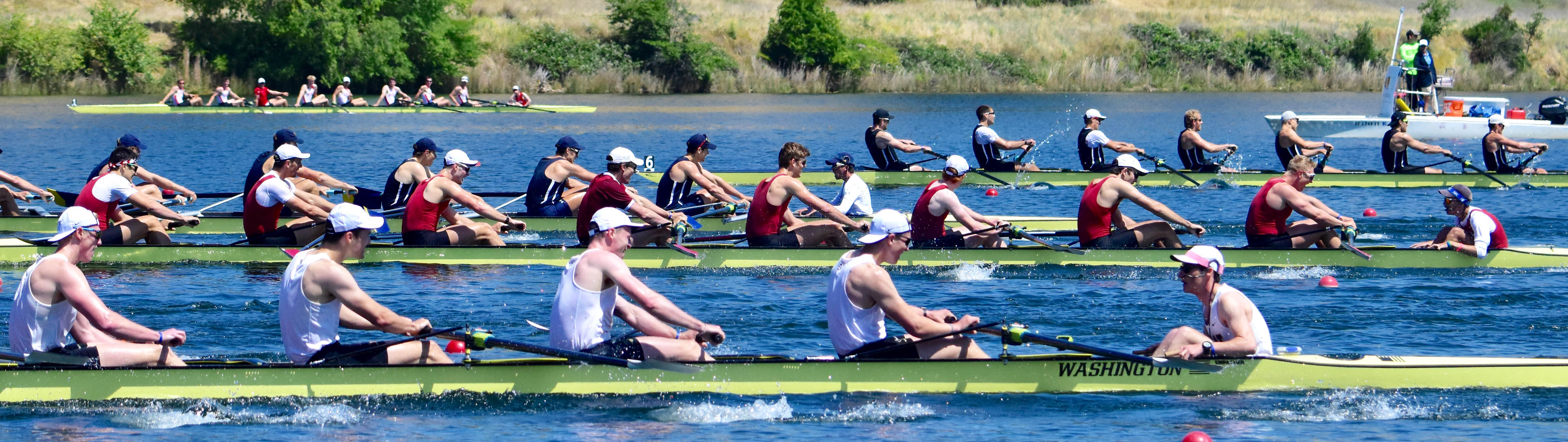
The University of Washington (foreground) at the 2019 IRA Championships where they won the Ten Eyck Trophy

The Jim Ten Eyck Memorial Trophy is presented annually by the Syracuse Regatta Association to the rowing team with the highest points score at the Intercollegiate Rowing Association regatta.

It is named after James A. Ten Eyck who was the coach of the Syracuse University crew from 1903 to 1937. The University of Washington has won the overall points champion trophy from 2007 through 2015, an unprecedented nine consecutive years, and more than any other program.

From 1952 through 1973, the winning team was the one with the most points in the varsity, junior varsity and freshman eights. Starting in 1974, all races counted in the scoring under a system adopted by the coaches of the Eastern Association of Rowing Colleges. More recently, the scoring system was revised to include only three of the four possible eights from each school in the points standings.

The points system is based on the number of regatta entrants. For example, with 18 entrants, the points system is as follows:

Event/Place	3V8	2V8	V8
1	54	72	90
2	51	68	85
3	48	64	80
4	45	60	75
5	42	56	70
6	39	52	65
7	36	48	60
8	33	44	55
9	30	40	50
10	27	36	45
11	24	32	40
12	21	28	35
13	18	24	30
14	15	20	25
15	12	16	20
16	9	12	15
17	6	8	10
18	3	4	5
