= Edward Hanlan Ten Eyck =

American rower and rowing coach (1879–1956)

Ned Ten Eyck
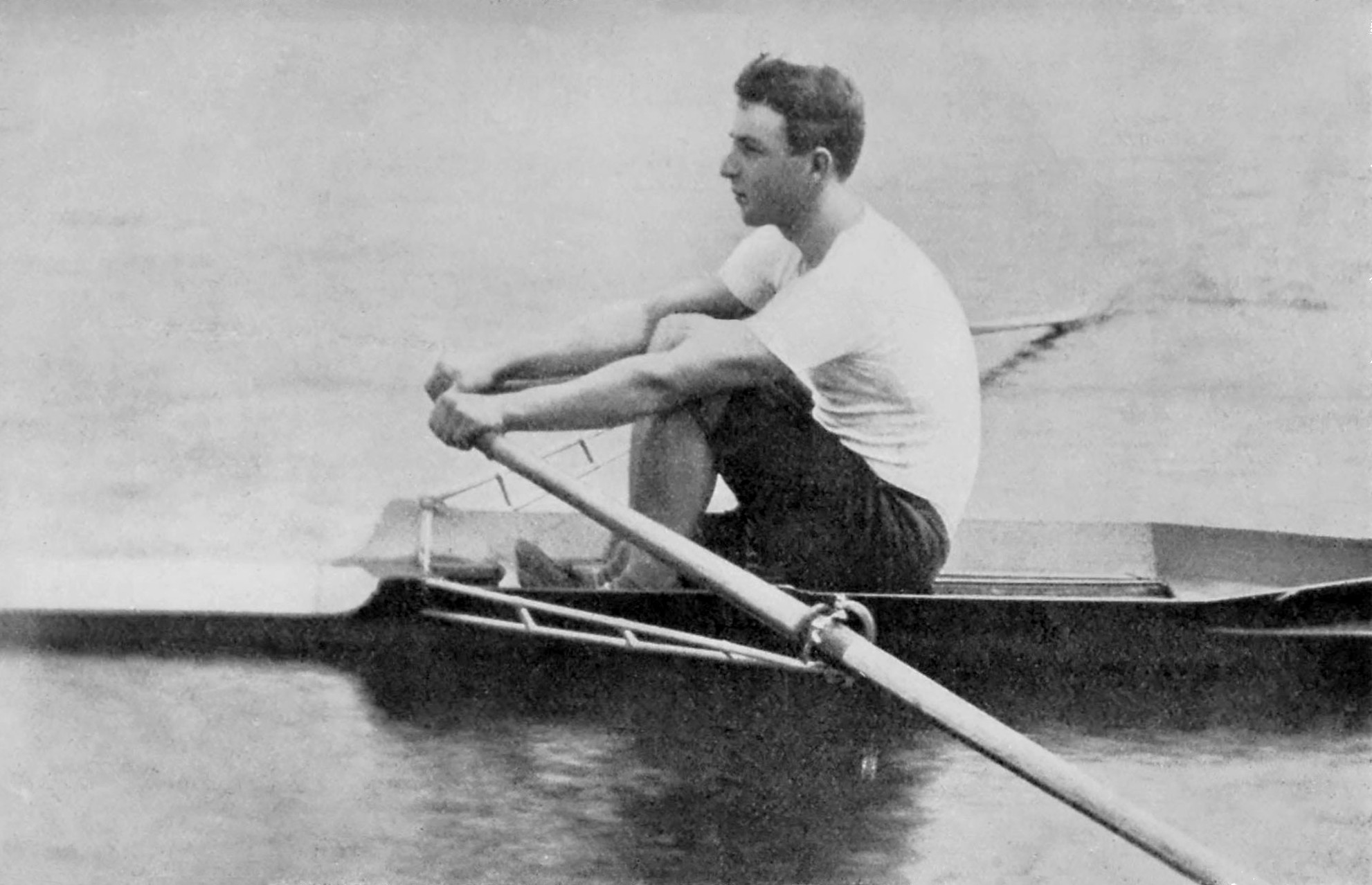
- Photo of Ten Eyck from the 1899 book How to Get Strong and How to Stay So.

Biographical details
- Born: August 7, 1879; Peekskill, New York
- Died: September 8, 1956 (aged 77); Idaho Falls, Idaho

Coaching career (HC unless noted)
- 1907-1910: University of Wisconsin–Madison
- 1934-1936: Rutgers University (Freshman squad)
- 1938–1949: Syracuse University
- Father: James A. Ten Eyck
- Family: Ten Eyck family

Edward Hanlan "Ned" Ten Eyck (August 7, 1879 – September 8, 1956) was an American champion rower and crew coach. He is best known for becoming the first American to win the Diamond Sculls championship at the Henley Royal Regatta in 1897.

Ten Eyck held the National Association of Amateur Oarsmen championship title in the single sculls in 1898, 1899, and 1901. He followed his father, crew coach James A. Ten Eyck, as head coach at Syracuse University. Both were members of the Dutch American Ten Eyck family. He was also head coach at University of Wisconsin–Madison and Rutgers University.

Ten Eyck was a native of Peekskill, New York. He died on September 8, 1956, in Idaho Falls, Idaho, after an operation for cancer.

Sporting positions
Preceded by Joseph Maguire	National Association of Amateur Oarsmen Championship Single Sculls; 1898–1899	Succeeded by John Rumouhr
Preceded by John Rumouhr	National Association of Amateur Oarsmen Championship Single Sculls; 1901	Succeeded by Constance Titus
