= James Juvenal =

American Olympic rower (1874–1942)

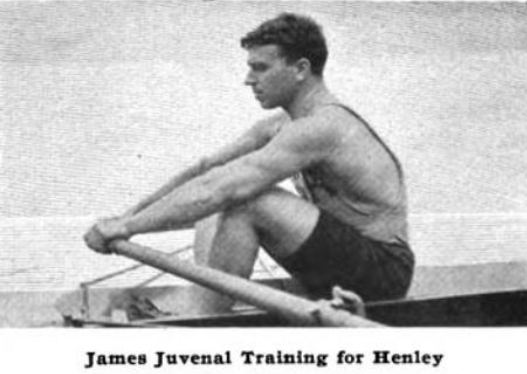

Medal record

Men's rowing

Representing the United States

Olympic Games
Gold medal – first place	1900 Paris	Men's eight
Silver medal – second place	1904 St. Louis	Single sculls

James Benner Juvenal (January 12, 1874 – September 1, 1942) was an American rower, born in Philadelphia, who competed in the 1900 Summer Olympics and in the 1904 Summer Olympics.

Juvenal began rowing when he was 19 years old and won his first race in 1893. He won the Middle States regatta in Scranton, Pennsylvania rowing in an aluminum shell which was reportedly the first time this type of boat was used in competition.

In 1900, he was part of the American boat from the Vesper Boat Club, which won the gold medal in the men's eight. Four years later, he won the silver medal in the single sculls.

He won over 100 races between 1893 and 1906 including the 1902 National Association single sculls championship and six consecutive championships of the Schuylkill Navy.

He became a professional rowing coach in 1906 and worked with Malta Boat Club and Penn Barge Club.

He worked at the Philadelphia Electric Company for over 40 years.

He died on September 1, 1942, and was interred at Laurel Hill Cemetery in Philadelphia.
