= Jacob H. Ten Eyck =

American merchant and politician

Member of the New York General Assembly
- In office 1757–1775

Personal details
- Born: January 22, 1708 Albany, Province of New York
- Died: November 16, 1776 (aged 68)
- Spouse: Anna Wendell (m. 1737)
- Parent(s): Hendrick Ten Eyck; Margarita Bleecker Ten Eyck
- Relatives: Jan Jansen Bleecker (grandfather); Jacob Coenraedt Ten Eyck (cousin)

Jacob H. Ten Eyck (January 22, 1708 – November 16, 1776) was an Albany merchant and alderman who served as a member of the New York General Assembly.

== Early life ==
Ten Eyck was born in Albany in the Province of New York on January 22, 1708. He was a son of Hendrick Ten Eyck (1680–1772) and Margarita (née Bleecker) Ten Eyck (1680–1773). Among his extended family was brother John H. Ten Eyck, an Indian trader who married Sara Ten Broeck.

His paternal grandparents were Jacob Coenraedtsen Ten Eyck and Geertruy Coeymans. His uncle was silversmith Coenradt Ten Eyck, the father of Jacob Coenraedt Ten Eyck, the Mayor of Albany from 1748 to 1750. His maternal grandparents were Grietje "Margaret" Rutse van Schoenderwoert and Jan Jansen Bleecker (also the Mayor of Albany from 1700 to 1701).

== Career ==
Ten Eyck was an Albany merchant who served as assistant alderman in the second ward from 1739 to 1743 and as an alderman from 1746 to 1748. In 1764, he joined other Albany merchants in petitioning the provincial government regarding the Indian trade. By the mid-1760s, his second ward property ranked among the most valuable on city assessment rolls. He also owned several lots in other parts of the city.

From 1759 to 1775, he represented Albany in the New York General Assembly.

== Personal life ==
On November 30, 1737, Ten Eyck was married to Annetje "Anna" Wendell (1709–1779) at the Albany Dutch Church. Anna was a daughter of Albany furrier Harmanus Wendell and Anna (née Glen) Wendell. Anna's sister, Elizabeth Wendell, married Jacob Bleecker (also a descendant of Jan Jansen Bleecker) and was the mother of Harmanus Bleecker, a U.S. Representative and the U.S. Minister to the Netherlands. By 1750, six children were baptized at the Albany church, including:

- Margarita Ten Eyck (b. 1738)
- Anna Ten Eyck (b. 1740), who died young.
- Anna Ten Eyck (b. 1742)
- Hendrick Ten Eyck Jr. (1744–1795), the sheriff of Albany who married Margarita Douw, a daughter of sloop captain Abraham Douw, in May 1767.
- Harmanus Ten Eyck (b. 1747), who died young.
- Harmanus Ten Eyck (1750–1828), who married Margaret Bleecker, daughter of Hendrick Bleecker and Catalyntie Cuyler.

Ten Eyck died on November 16, 1776. His widow died in 1779.
