= James A. Ten Eyck =

American rowing coach (1851–1938)

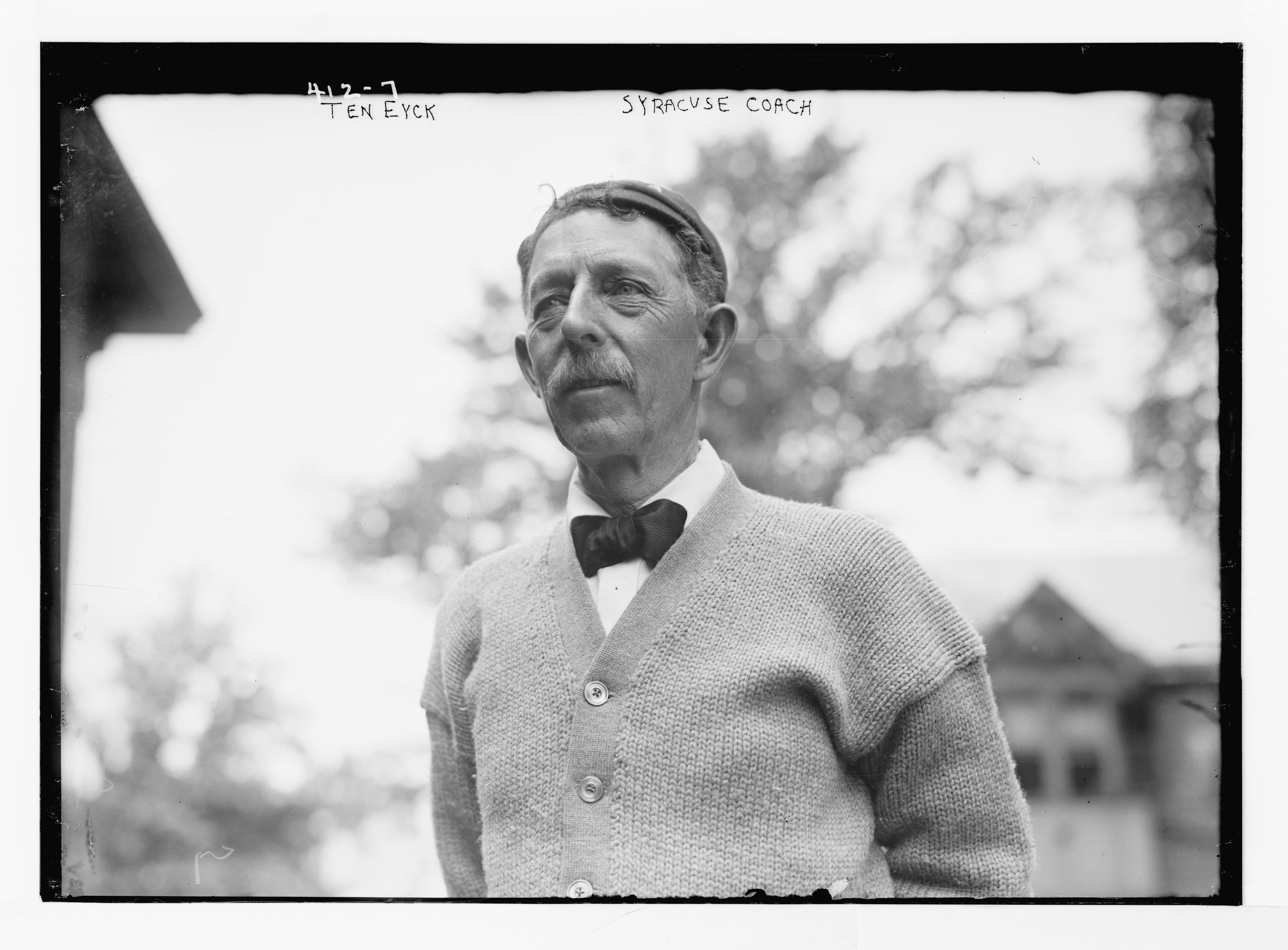

Biographical details
- Born: October 16, 1851; Tomkins Cove, New York
- Died: February 11, 1938 (aged 86)

Coaching career (HC unless noted)
- 1899–1901: United States Naval Academy
- 1903–1938: Syracuse University

Accomplishments and honors

Championships
- 4 national (1908, 1913, 1916 and 1920); 6 Freshman's squads (1906, 1915, 1922, 1925, 1929 and 1930)
- Children: Edward Hanlan Ten Eyck
- Family: Ten Eyck family

James A. Ten Eyck (October 16, 1851 – February 11, 1938) was a crew coach at United States Naval Academy and Syracuse University. He was born in Tomkins Cove, New York and is the father of Edward H. "Ned" Ten Eyck, who coached crew for the University of Wisconsin–Madison from 1907 to 1910, and took over coaching duties at Syracuse from his father after his death. He was inducted into the Greater Syracuse Sports Hall of Fame on October 21, 2002.

== Coaching career ==
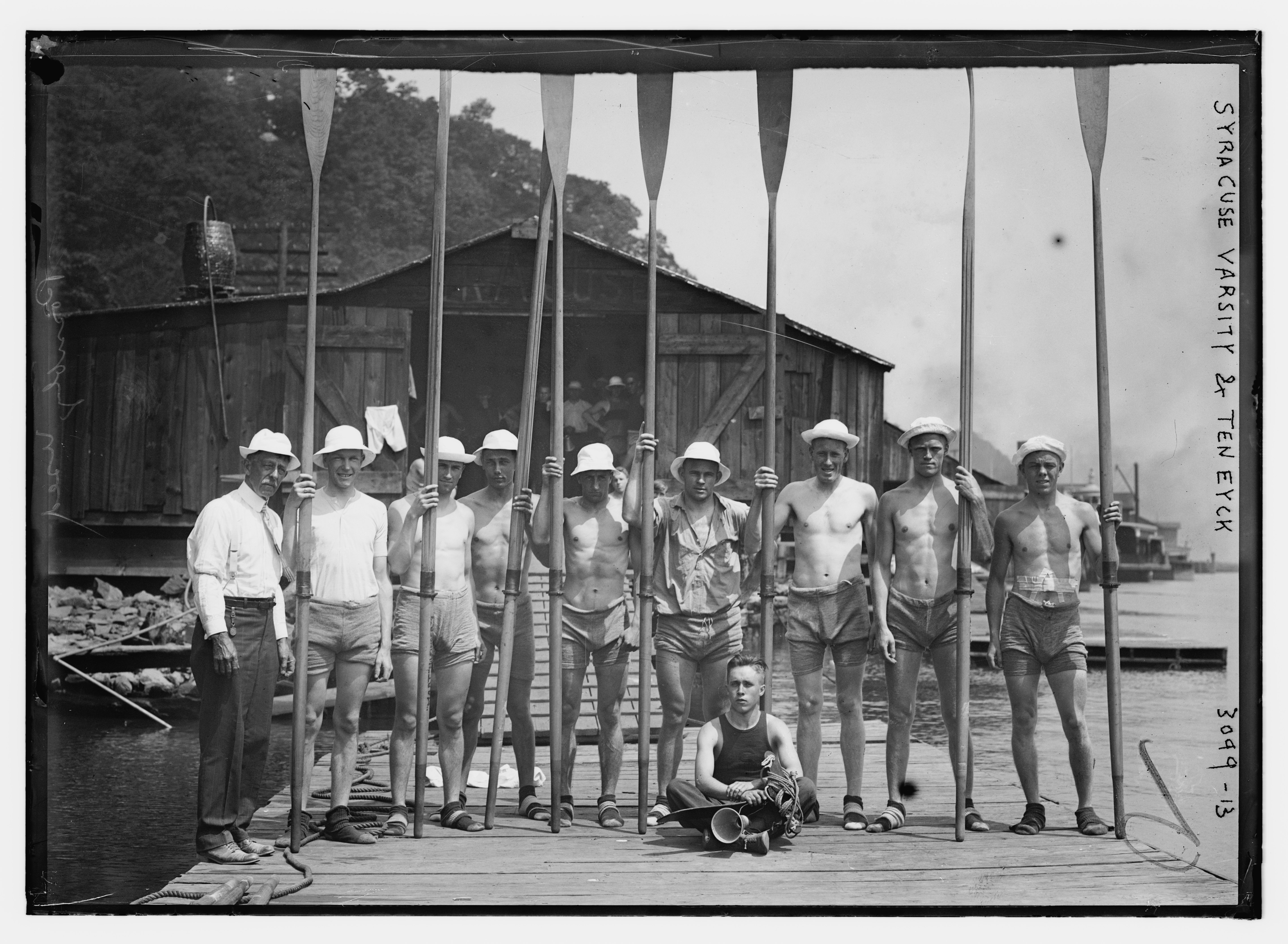
Syracuse Varsity and Ten Eyck in 1910.

Ten Eyck began his coaching career at the Naval Academy from 1899 to 1901. He moved to Syracuse University in 1903 after Edwin Sweetland resigned the post. As Syracuse coach, he captured ten National Championships.

For his coaching accomplishments James Ten Eyck was honored in several ways. The Ten Eyck Trophy, awarded to the all-points champion at the Intercollegiate Rowing Association Regatta is named for him. In 1937, Syracuse named the boathouse for the rowing teams the James Ten Eyck Memorial Boathouse.

=== National Championships ===
- Varsity: 1908, 1913, 1916 and 1920
- Freshman's squads: 1906, 1915, 1922, 1925, 1929 and 1930
