= USS Menemsha =

20th-century American cargo ship

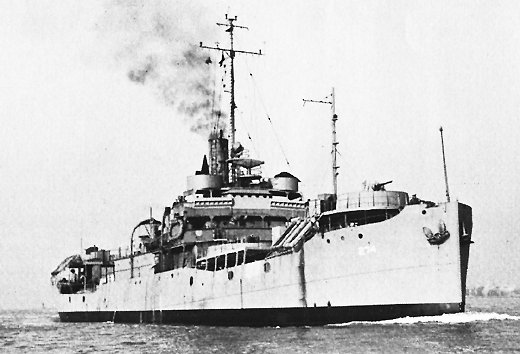
- USCGC Menemsha (WAG-274)

History

United States
- Name: USS Menemsha
- Namesake: Menemsha Pond, a bight in Gay Head, Martha's Vineyard, off the coast of Massachusetts
- Owner: Bison Steamship Corporation
- Builder: McDougall-Duluth Co., Duluth, Minnesota
- Launched: 31 July 1918
- Completed: in October 1918 as SS Lake Orange
- Acquired: by the Navy 19 September 1941
- Commissioned: 20 January 1942 as USS Menemsha (AG-39)
- Recommissioned: 22 October 1943 as USCGC Menemsha (WAG-274)
- Decommissioned: date unknown
- Renamed: USS Menemsha (AG-39), 15 October 1941
- Stricken: 30 October 1943
- Fate: Scrapped in 1951

General characteristics
- Type: commercial cargo ship
- Displacement: 2,580 tons
- Length: 261 ft (80 m)
- Beam: 43 ft 6 in (13.26 m)
- Draft: 20 ft 3 in (6.17 m)
- Propulsion: triple expansion reciprocating steam engine, single shaft, 1,200shp
- Speed: 10 knots
- Complement: 58 officers and enlisted
- Armament: one single 4 in (100 mm) gun mount; four single .30 cal (7.62 mm) machine guns; two depth charge projectors

USS Menemsha (AG-39) was a cargo ship acquired by the U.S. Navy during World War II. She was used as a weather-gathering ship, a patrol craft and convoy escort vessel in the North Atlantic Ocean. Although a Navy ship, she was operated by the U.S. Coast Guard, and eventually was transferred to that agency as USCGC Menemsha (WAG-274).

== Built in Duluth, Minnesota ==
Ordered as the Menemsha (AG-39) was built and launched as the Lake Orange by McDougall Duluth Shipbuilding Company, Duluth, Minnesota, in 1918; purchased as John Gehm by the Maritime Commission from her owners, Bison Steamship Corp., Buffalo, New York, in 1941; acquired by the Navy 19 September 1941; renamed Menemsha and classified AG-39 on 15 October 1941; converted from a lake cargo hauler to a weather patrol ship by Maryland Drydock Company. Baltimore, Maryland; and commissioned under loan to the U.S. Coast Guard 20 January 1942.

== World War II service ==
Assigned to duty with the North Atlantic Weather Patrol, Menemsha patrolled various at sea weather stations out of Boston, Massachusetts, and Argentia, Newfoundland. Averaging about 3 weeks a patrol, she braved the perils of the storm tossed North Atlantic Ocean and the menace of German U-boats to gather valuable weather data from her isolated positions.

In addition, Menemsha maintained a constant alert for the enemy undersea raiders as well as for survivors from torpedoed ships. While patrolling south of Newfoundland 20 August 1942, she rescued the only five survivors from the British merchant ship Arletta, torpedoed by U-458 on 4 August while a straggler from Convoy ON 115. Menemsha returned the survivors to Boston 25 August.

Almost 1 year later, Menemsha, on a weather patrol, sighted a German submarine. As she steamed about midway between the Virginia Capes and the Azores on the moonlit night of 11 August 1943, her lookout spotted a surfaced sub, U-760, about 6,000 yards off her starboard bow. She closed for attack and began shelling the U-boat with 4 inch gunfire. During the next half-hour she chased the enemy which responded with "incoherent recognition signals" rather than with torpedoes or return fire. The determined weather patrol ship fired 20 rounds, one of which struck close aboard the fleeing sub's conning tower.

Menemsha broke off attack after suspecting the presence of other enemy U-boats in the area. She rendezvoused with a hunter killer group, headed by USS Croatan, at noon the 12th; however, patrolling aircraft and escorting destroyers failed to flush U-760, who interned herself on the Spanish coast 8 September.

== Transfer to the U.S. Coast Guard ==
The Navy transferred Menemsha to the Coast Guard 22 October 1943 and she was commissioned as USCGC Menemsha (WAG 274). Her name was struck from the Navy List 30 October 1943. After long and valuable service in the Coast Guard, she was scrapped in 1951.
