= John Adams Ten Eyck III =

American painter

John Adams Ten Eyck III (October 28, 1893 - October 21, 1932) was a painter and etcher.

== Biography ==
He was born on October 28, 1893, in Bridgeport, Connecticut. He was the son of Dr. John Adams Ten Eyck II (?-1906) and Bella Burnham. He attended the New York School of Fine and Applied Arts. In 1918 he married and then served in World War I. He died in Shippan Point in Stamford, Connecticut. His granddaughter was Beverley Sener who married Aubin Lueckner.
