= Van Eyck =

Van Eyck or van Eijk (pronounced [vɑn ˈɛik]) is a Dutch toponymic surname. Eijck, Eyck, Eyk and Eijk are all archaic spellings of modern Dutch eik ("oak") and the surname literally translates as "from/of oak". However, in most cases, the family name refers to an origin in Maaseik. This city on the Meuse, now in Belgium on the border with the Netherlands, was originally simply known as Eike (with many spellings) and from the 13th century as Old Eyck and New Eyck. Names with an affix (tussenvoegsel), like Van der Eijk, are more likely to refer directly to the tree. This article lists people with this surname.

== Renaissance family of painters ==
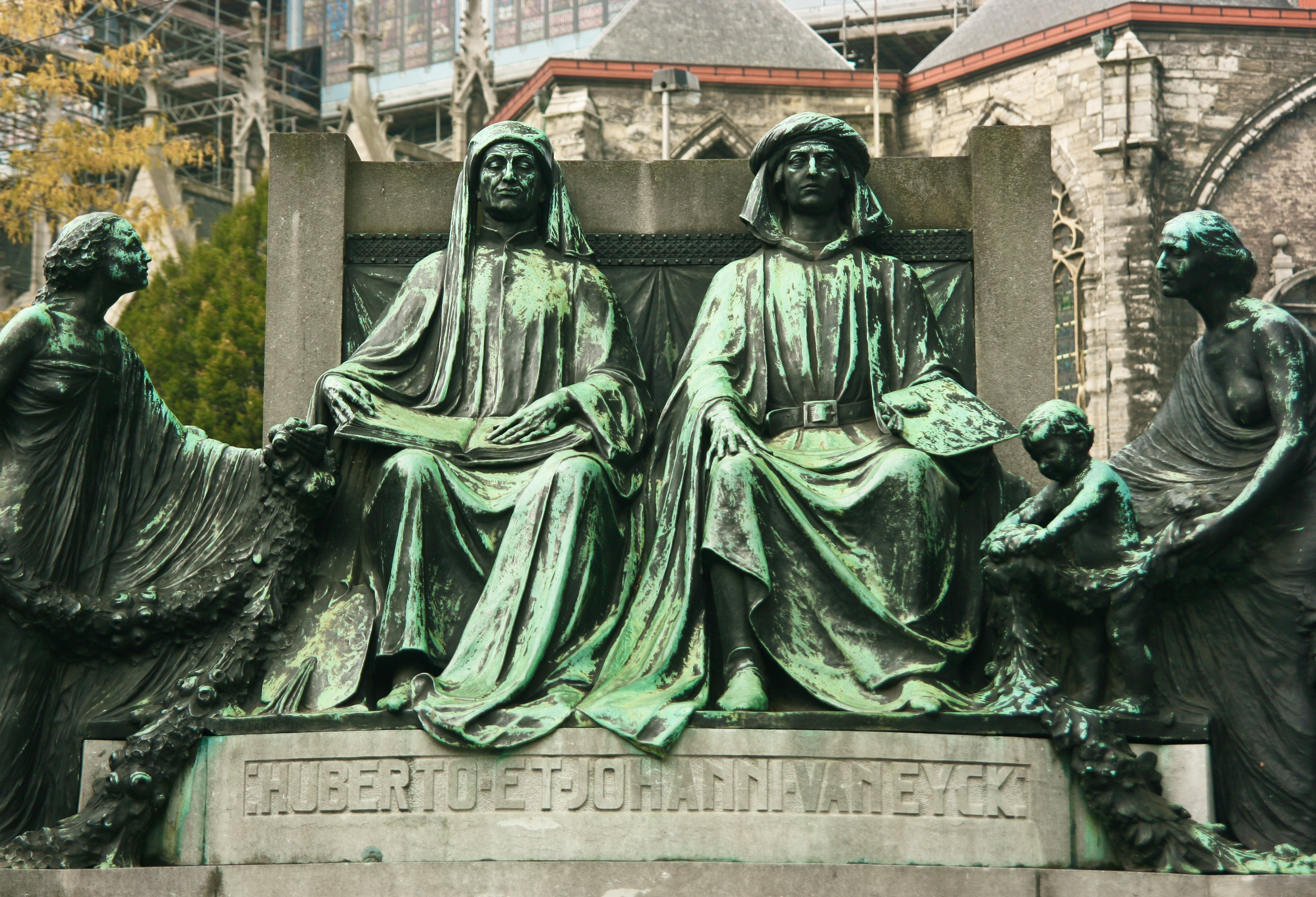
A statue in Ghent, Belgium, depicts the van Eyck brothers, Hubert and Jan.

The important Flemish family of Early Netherlandish painters with the surname van Eyck originated in Maaseik, but ultimately established their professional domicile in Ghent and in Bruges. There they changed the traditional habits of the earlier schools, remodeled the earlier forms of Flemish design, and introduced a substantial revolution into the technical methods of execution familiar to their countrymen. These painters were responsible for many famous works of the 15th century.

Family members included: Hubert van Eyck (1380s – 1426), Jan van Eyck (c.1390 – 1441), their brother Lambert van Eyck, and sister Margareta van Eyck, Jan's wife, also Margaretha (1405/06 – aft.1441), and probably Barthélemy d'Eyck (c.1420 – aft.1470) from the next generation. Jan van Eyck, active in Bruges, is probably the best known Northern European painter of the 15th century.

== Other people ==
=== Van Eyck ===
- Aldo van Eyck (1918–1999), Dutch architect, son of Pieter Nicolaas
- Casper van Eyck (1613–1674), Flemish marine painter
- Jacob van Eyck (c. 1590–1657), Dutch musician and carillon technician
- Jannie van Eyck-Vos (1936–2020), Dutch track and field athlete
- Marie-Paule Van Eyck (born 1951), Belgian fencer
- Nangila van Eyck (born 1984), Dutch football striker
- Nicolaas van Eyck (1617–1679), Flemish painter of landscapes, equestrian and battle scenes, civil processions and portraits
- Peter van Eyck (1911–1969), German-American actor
- Pieter Nicolaas van Eyck (1887–1954), Dutch poet and philosopher, father of Aldo and Robert Floris

=== Van Eijk ===
- Anita van Eijk (born 1969), wife of Prince Pieter-Christiaan of Orange-Nassau, van Vollenhoven
- Bram van Eijk (born 1996), Dutch football defender
- Collin van Eijk (born 1991), Dutch football goalkeeper
- Marc van Eijk (born 1981), Suriname-born Dutch footballer
- Paul van Eijk (born 1986), Cook Islands footballer
- Stig van Eijk (born 1981), Norwegian singer, composer and lyricist
- Wendy van Eijk (born 1973), Dutch politician
- Willem van Eijk (1941–2019), Dutch serial killer
- Wim van der Eijk (born 1957), Dutch vice-president of the European Patent Office

=== Van Eyck ===
- Jan van Eyck (1390-1441), Dutch Renaissance painter

== See also ==
- 9561 van Eyck, main belt asteroid named after Jan van Eyck
- Van Eyck (crater), crater on Mercury named after Jan van Eyck
- Ten Eyck, Dutch surname of similar origin
