= Gillin Boat Club =

American rowing club

Coordinates: 39.99076°N 75.19675°W

- Location: 2200 Kelly Drive, Philadelphia, Pennsylvania, U.S.A.
- Home water: Schuylkill River
- Established: 2002
- Navy admission: 2004
- Membership: 200
- Colors: Crimson and Gray . - These are the official hex colors as per the university's graphics guidelines.
- Website: sjprep.org

Gillin Boat Club is the rowing program for St. Joseph's University Rowing and St. Joseph's Prep Rowing. It is situated at the 1,000-meter mark of the Schuylkill River race course in Fairmount Park, Philadelphia, Pennsylvania. Gillin Boat Club was admitted to the Schuylkill Navy in 2004, by a unanimous vote of the Navy's members.

The club's state-of-the-art boathouse has the capacity for 42 eights, 14 fours (quads), and 14 small boats. It was the first new boathouse built on this stretch of the Schuylkill River in 98 years.

Gillin also hosts the Fairmount Park Commission's Community Rowing Program, which is designed to provide an experience for youth in the city of Philadelphia who have not had the opportunity to experience the sport of rowing.

== Robert M. Gillin Jr. Boathouse ==
In 1998, Philadelphia City Council approved construction of what is now known as the Robert M. Gillin Jr. Boathouse. The boathouse was dedicated in May 2002. The building was designed by Robert L. Owen - Architects and built by Nason and Cullen, Inc. While some have praised the structure as "the Taj Mahal of Kelly Drive," others have levied criticism on the boathouse's design, calling it a "bloated hulk of a building." Work has been done to repair the second floor, which began buckling shortly after construction was completed.

== University Crew ==
The Men's and women's crew teams of St. Joseph's University regularly compete on a national level.

=== Dad Vail Regatta ===
St. Joseph's University has been a perennial contender at the Dad Vail Regatta, the nation's largest collegiate regatta.

In 2019, Saint Joseph's won Gold in the Men's Third Varsity Heavyweight Eight. Saint Joseph's took home Silver in the Second Varsity Heavyweight Eight Category.

In 2018, Saint Joseph's won Gold in the Men's Third Varsity Heavyweight Eight. Saint Joseph's took home silver medals in the First and Second Varsity Heavyweight Eight Categories in 2018 as well.

In 2017, Saint Joseph's won Gold in the Men's Second Varsity Heavyweight Eight, as well as Gold in the Men's Third Varsity Heavyweight Eight. Saint Joseph's Men's First Varsity Heavyweight Eight took home silver that same year, their first medal in the Varsity Eight category since 1999.

In 2010, St. Joe's won gold in the Men's Frosh/Novice Heavyweight Eight.

In 2008, St. Joe's won a silver in the Women's Frosh/Novice Heavyweight Eight and a bronze in the Men's JV Heavyweight Eight.

In 2007, the team finished 2nd in Overall Points and 3rd in Women's Points.

In 2006, the Women won the Varsity 8 for the first time in its long history. The team finished 1st in Overall Points, 1st in Men's Points, and 2nd in Women's Points.

In 2005, the team finished 1st in Overall Points, 1st in Men's Points, and 3rd in Women's Points.

In 2004, St. Joseph's won 2nd in Overall Points, Men's Points, and Women's Points.

Earlier in its history, St. Joseph's University won a gold medal at the 1970 Dad Vail Regatta and a silver medal in 1959, the first year of the program's existence.

=== IRA Championship Regatta ===
The Intercollegiate Rowing Association's IRA Championship Regatta is the most competitive race in collegiate rowing and is considered to be the United States collegiate national championship of rowing. In 2004, St. Joe's Varsity Four finished fourth in the Grand Final at the IRAs. In recent years, St. Joseph's has qualified multiple boats for IRAs.

The Men's Team has competed at the IRA National Championship twice since 2017. They look to compete at this event each year against the top teams in the country, competing for a national title.

=== Henley Royal Regatta ===
The University Crew has competed at the prestigious Henley Royal Regatta, a race in England. In 1999, a crew from St. Joseph's pursued the Temple Challenge Cup at Henley.

=== Alumni ===
The University Crew has placed many of its alumni along the east coast, whom regularly compete together in the fall. Most notably, the Saint Joseph's University alumni crew won a medal at the 2019 Head of the Charles Regatta in Boston, MA.

== Preparatory crew ==
St. Joseph's Preparatory School has amassed racing records unequaled by any other American high school, including winning the Stotesbury Cup fifteen times since 1987.

=== Stotesbury Cup Regatta ===
The Stotesbury Cup Regatta is the largest high school regatta in the United States and is considered the high school national championship. The Boys Senior Eight boat won the Stotesbury Cup in 1955, 1987, 1992, 1995, 1997, 1999, 2000, 2001, 2005, 2008, 2010, 2019, 2021, 2023, 2024 and 2025; and the Boys Lightweight Eight won in 1978, 1979, 1981, 1986, 1993, 1997, 1998, 1999, 2000, 2001, 2002, 2003, 2005, 2007, 2008, 2010, 2011, 2012, 2013, 2014, 2015, 2016, 2017, 2018, 2019, 2021, and 2023.

In addition, The Prep is the only team to ever sweep all of the eights races at the regatta. This feat was first accomplished in 1997.

In 2008, St. Joe's Prep accomplished nearly the same result sweeping all five events in the eight-man category. As a result of the sweep, a poll by Row2k.com ranked The Prep as the crew of the week, over collegiate national champions. Vespoli, a manufacturer of racing shells highlighted the team's accomplishment among other national champions.

=== Henley Royal Regatta ===
The Prep regularly competes at the Henley Royal Regatta. Rowers from St. Joseph's Prep "have been to Henley eight times and won the prestigious Princess Elizabeth Challenge Cup in 2000." In 2010, St. Joseph's Prep lost to the Kent School in the semi-finals. In 2008, St. Joseph's Prep was eliminated by Eton College in the quarter-finals. In 2005, St. Joseph's made it to the finals, but lost to Eton College. The Prep's quest for the Princess Elizabeth Cup in 2005 made news in London as well as in the United States. The Prep competed at the Henley Royal Regatta in 1980, 1984, 1988, 1991, 1995, 1999, 2000, 2005, 2008, 2010, 2011, 2019, 2021 and 2023.

=== Olympic Games ===
Several Prep Crew alumni have gone on to compete in the Olympic Games including 2004 gold medalist Peter Cipollone '89 (2000 Games as well). Other Prep Olympic rowers include Michael Peterson '85 (1996 Atlanta Games), Tom Welsh '95 (2000 Sydney Games) and Mike Gennaro '07 (2012 London Olympics alternate).
