= Pennsylvania Barge Club =

Coordinates: 39.96934°N 75.18729°W

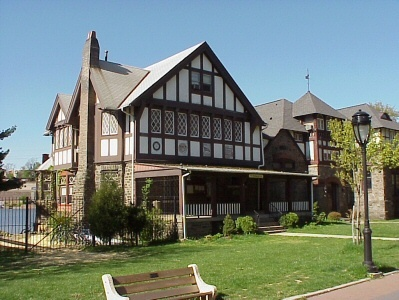
- Location: #4 Boathouse Row, Philadelphia, Pennsylvania, U.S.
- Home water: Schuylkill River
- Established: 1861
- Navy admission: 1865 (reinstated 2009)
- Former names: Atlantic Barge Club
- Key people: Michael Ragan (President)
- Affiliations: LaSalle College High School
- Pennsylvania Barge Club
- U.S. Historic district – Contributing property
- Philadelphia Register of Historic Places
- Location within Pennsylvania Location within the United States
- Location: Philadelphia, Pennsylvania, U.S.
- Architects: Furness & Evans, et al.
- Part of: Boathouse Row (ID87000821)
- Added to NRHP: February 27, 1987

Pennsylvania Barge Club is an amateur rowing club, situated along the historic Boathouse Row of Philadelphia, Pennsylvania. It was founded in 1861 and joined the Schuylkill Navy in 1865. The club's boathouse, at #4 Boathouse Row, is also known as the Hollenback House, named for William M. Hollenback Jr., who served as President of USRowing from 1979 until 1985.

Painter Thomas Eakins was most likely a longtime member of Pennsylvania Barge Club. His friend, Max Schmitt, rowed for the club, and won the single sculls championship 6 times.

In Schuylkill Navy races, Pennsylvania Barge had 359 entries and 106 victories. Its teams represented the United States in the 1920 (four-with-cox), 1924 (four-with), 1928 (four-with and four-without), and 1932 (pair-with) Olympic Games.

As a result of World War II, the club suffered a drastic reduction in membership. In 1955, the Club turned its boathouse over to the Schuylkill Navy. Thereafter, the Pennsylvania Barge Club served as an administrative center for rowing, including serving as Headquarters for the National Association of Amateur Oarsmen, which later became USRowing. The building also housed the Schuylkill Navy, the United States rowing Society (formerly Schuylkill Navy Association), the Philadelphia Scholastic Rowing Association, the Middle States Regatta Association, and the Dad Vail Rowing Association.

In 2009, the club was reactivated and reinstated as a member of the Schuylkill Navy.

== History of the boathouse ==
In 1868, the club received permission from the Fairmount Park Commission to build a replacement for its brick house. Between 1869 and 1871, the Club erected a boathouse with Crescent Boat Club. In 1892, Pennsylvania Barge Club replaced their half of the double boathouse. Architect, Luis Hickman, designed Pennsylvania Barge Club's boathouse in the picturesque Victorian style. Hickman was a member of the T-Square Club and known for his renovation of Merchants' Exchange Building. In 1912, the Club hired C.E. Schermerhorn to add second floor of timber and stucco.

== Photo gallery ==
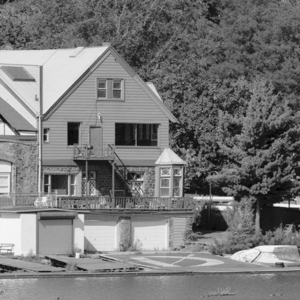
Pennsylvania Barge Club,
#4 Boathouse Row in 1972 with a Drexel "D" painted on the dock.

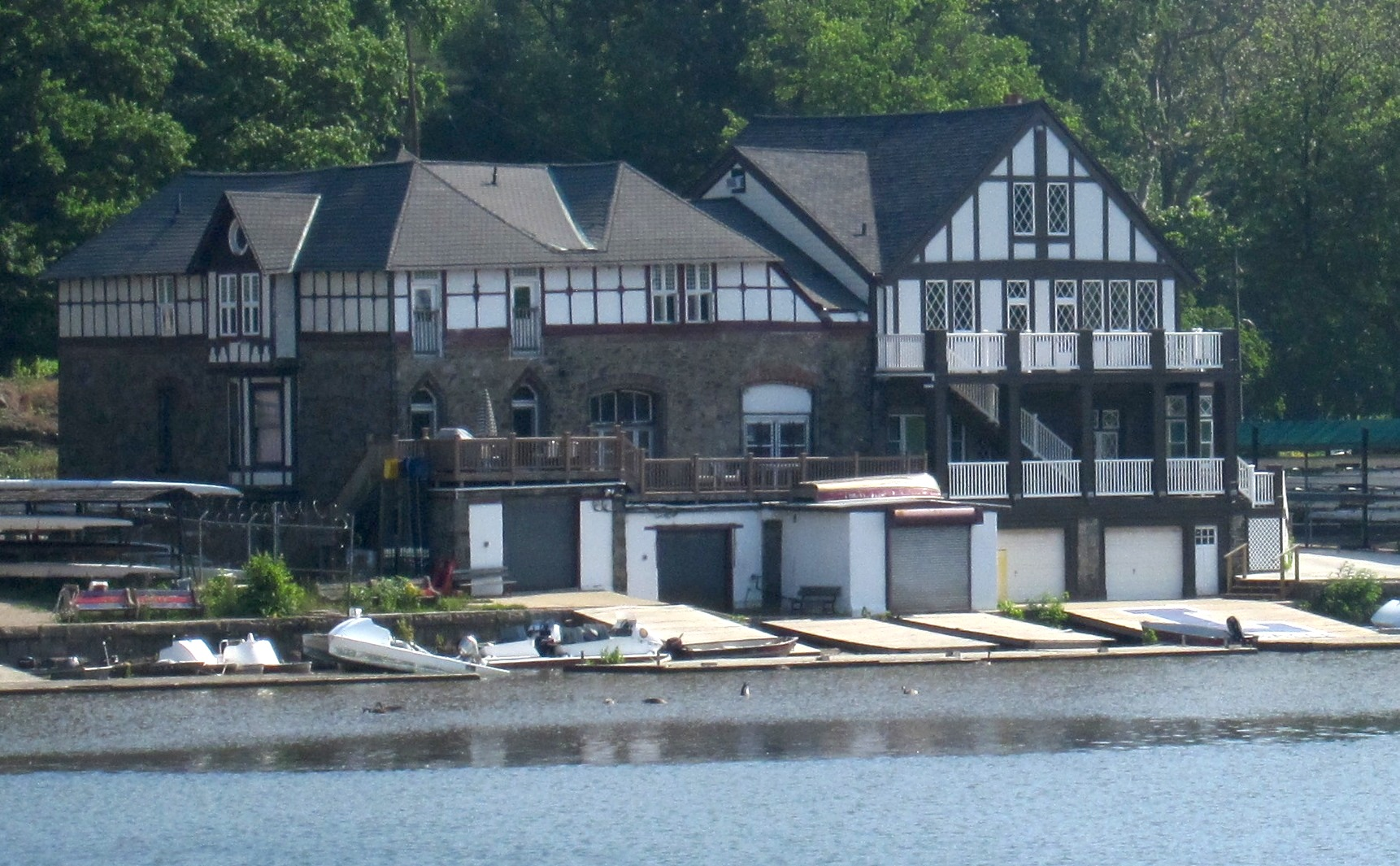
Crescent & Pennsylvania Barge Club in 2010 with an "L" painted on the dock for La Salle College Higschool

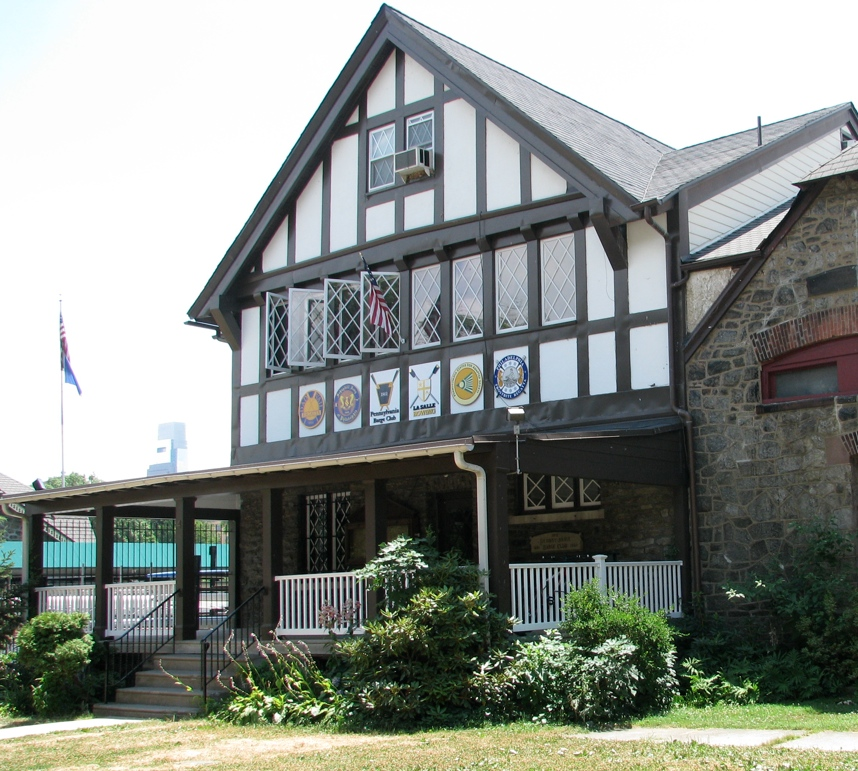
Pennsylvania Barge Club from Kelly Drive.

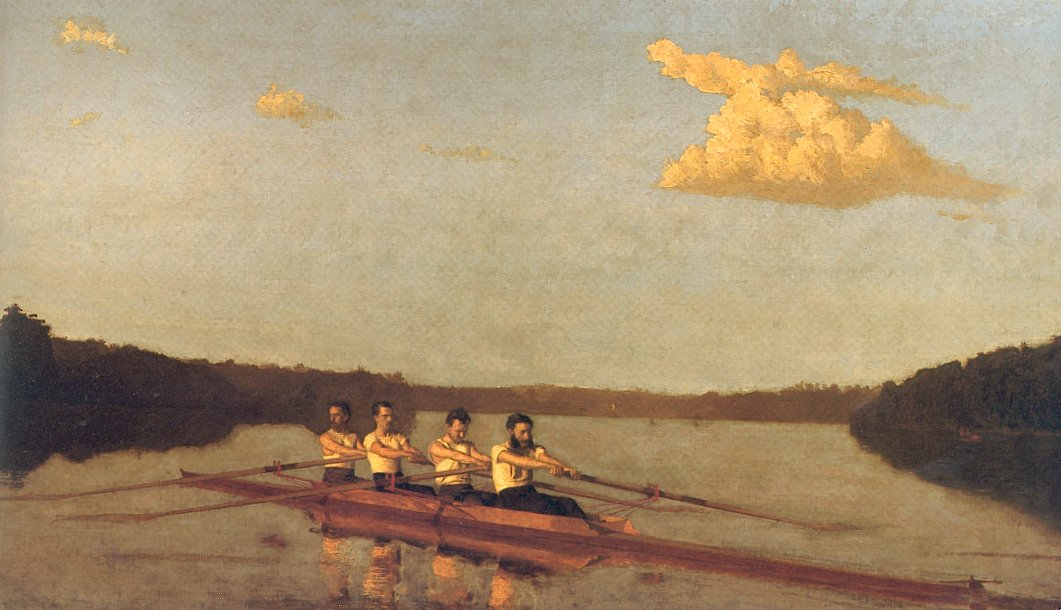
"Oarsmen on the Schuylkill" also known as "Pennsylvania Barge Club Four" by Thomas Eakins (c. 1874).

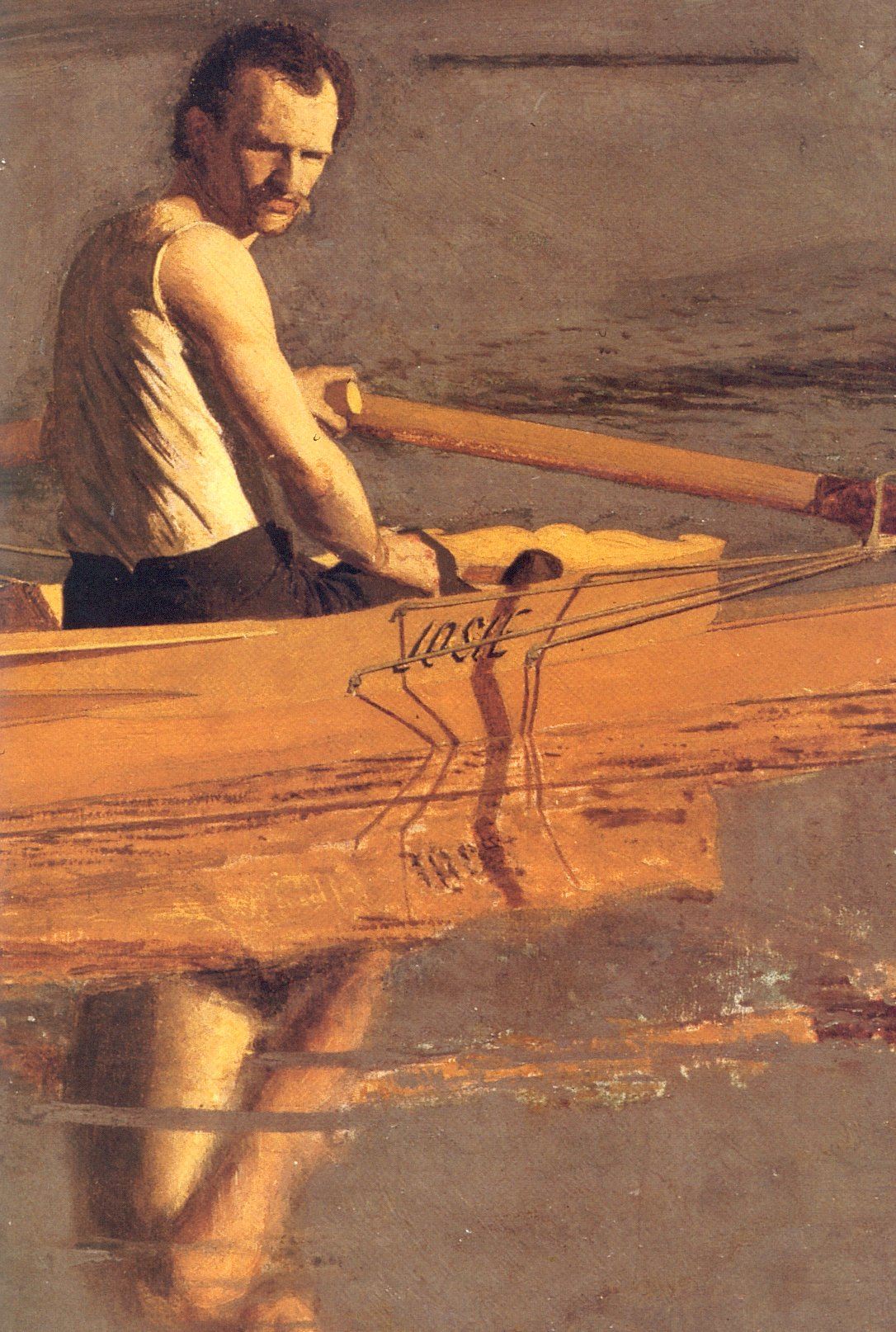
Max Schmitt, 6-time single-sculls champion. Detail of the Eakins painting Max Schmitt in a Single Scull.

== See also ==
- Max Schmitt in a Single Scull
