= Max Schmitt in a Single Scull =

1871 painting by Thomas Eakins

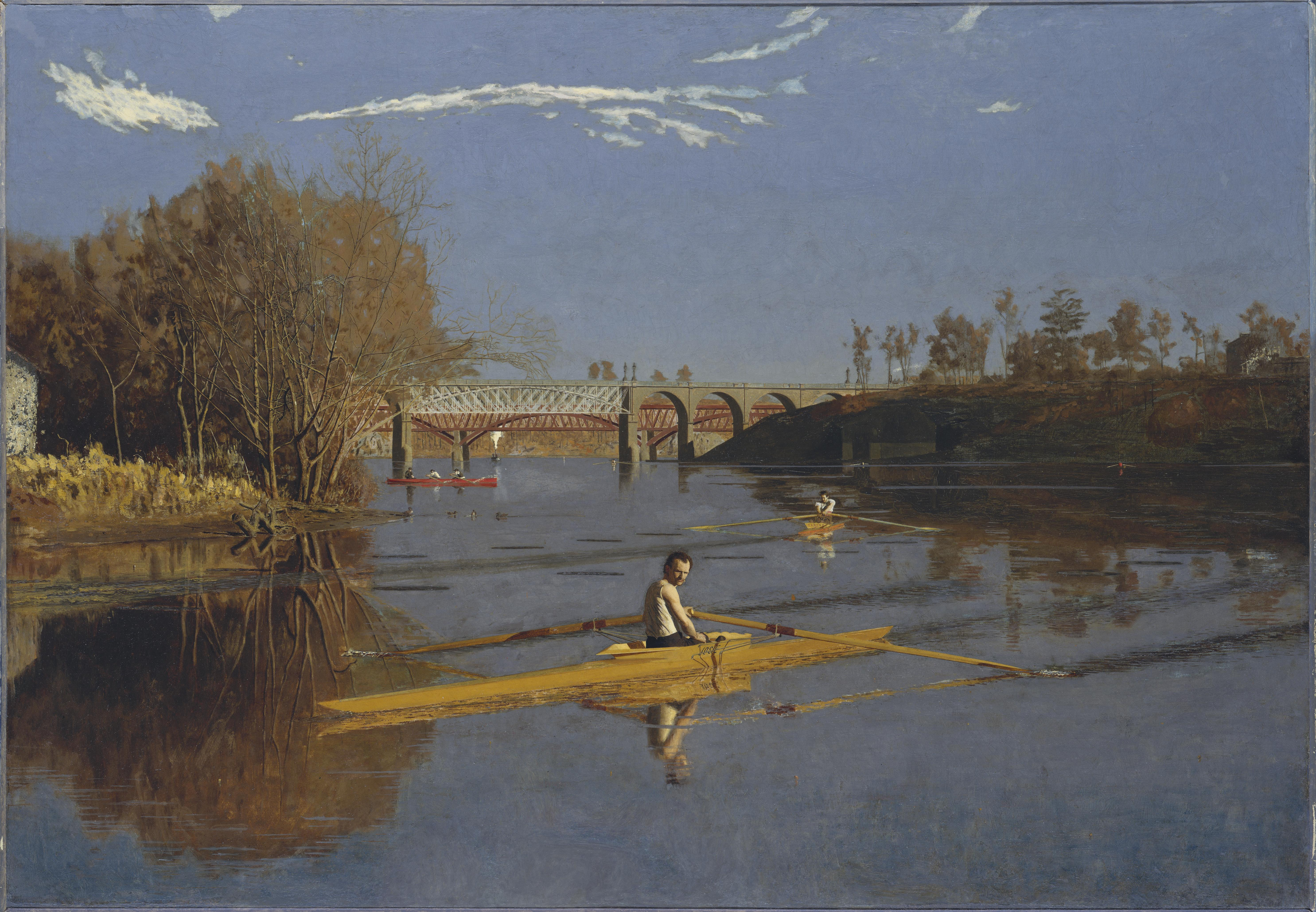
- Artist: Thomas Eakins
- Year: 1871
- Catalogue: G-44
- Medium: Oil on canvas
- Dimensions: 82.6 cm × 117.5 cm (32 1/2 in × 46 1/4 in)
- Location: Metropolitan Museum of Art, New York

Max Schmitt in a Single Scull (also known as The Champion Single Sculls or The Champion, Single Sculls) is an 1871 oil-on-canvas painting by the American artist Thomas Eakins, Goodrich catalogue #44. It is in the permanent collection of the Metropolitan Museum of Art. Set on the Schuylkill River in Philadelphia, Pennsylvania, it celebrates Eakins's friend Max Schmitt's victory in the October 5, 1870, single sculls competition.

== The sculler ==
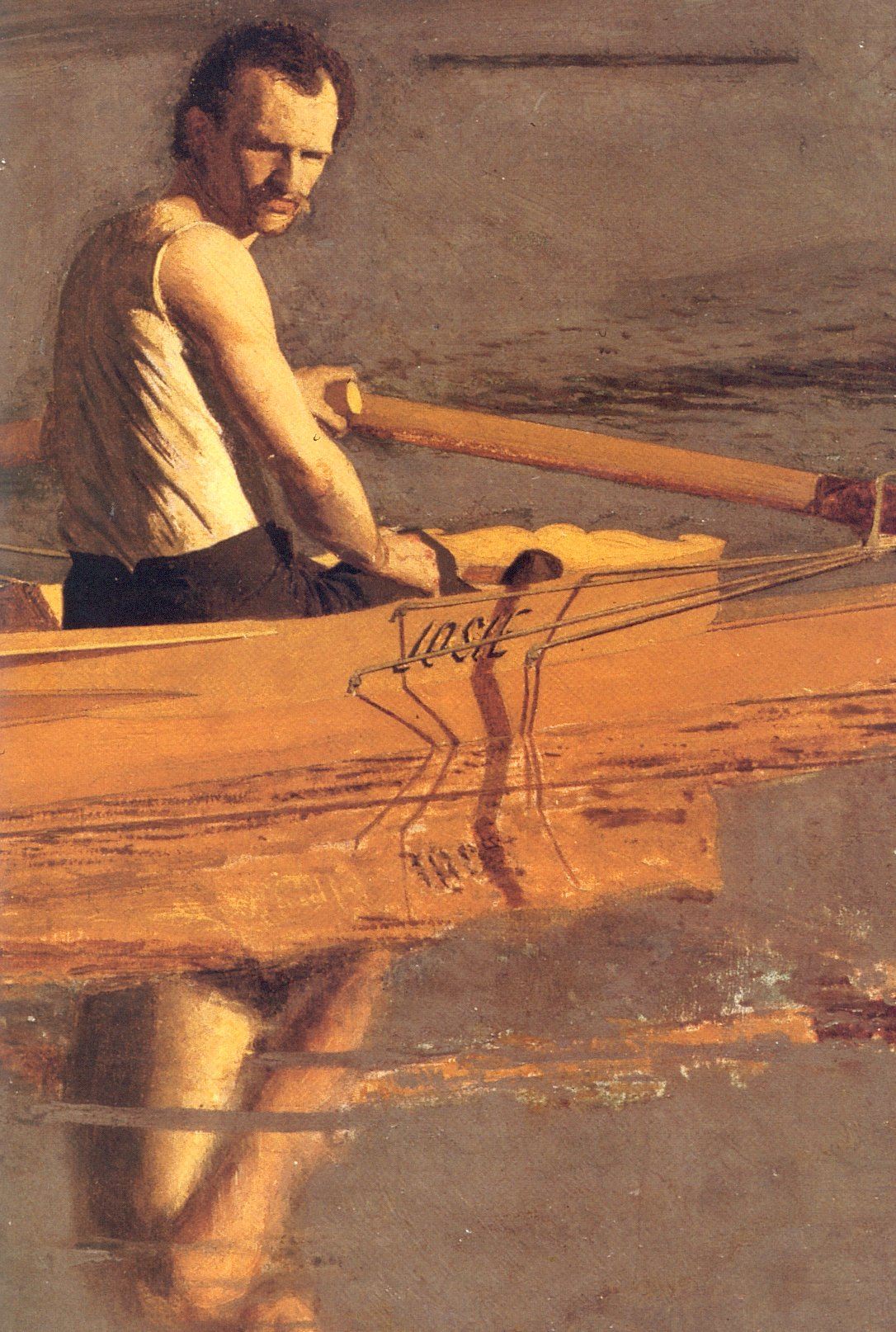
Detail of Schmitt. Note the riggers.

Max Schmitt (1843–1900) had attended Philadelphia Central High School with Eakins, and the two were close friends. Schmitt was a member of the Pennsylvania Barge Club – as, it is presumed, was Eakins – one of nine men's clubs in the Schuylkill Navy, and twelve that rowed on the river. The Schuylkill Navy had been organized in 1858, with approximately 300 members, and began hosting annual regattas in 1859 (with a four-year hiatus for the American Civil War). Initially, the races were for 6-oared and 4-oared gigs and barges, but a new kind of lightweight craft was rapidly gaining popularity: the racing scull.

Sculls, or shells, were narrower, longer, and a lot faster. Gigs had their oarlocks mounted on the sides (like a rowboat), but sculls had them a couple feet outside the boat thanks to riggers, triangular braces that projected out from the sides. This increased the efficiency of every stroke, and led to much longer oars. Meanwhile, boats got longer and hulls got narrower, until they were as narrow as was possible while still retaining sufficient buoyancy and balance.

Schmitt was an early convert to sculls, and owned his own, named "Josie" after his sister. The name of the scull is visible in the painting just below Schmitt's right hand. In September 1866, the Schuylkill Navy's annual regatta first featured a single-sculls race (3 miles, 1 turn), and Schmitt won it. He won again in July 1867, but in September came in second to another Pennsylvania Barge rower in a longer (4 miles, 1 turn) race. He did not participate in 1868, when fellow Pennsylvania Barge rowers won first and second. Schmitt won the single-sculls title again in June 1869, but in September came in second to an Undine Barge Club rower.

== The race ==
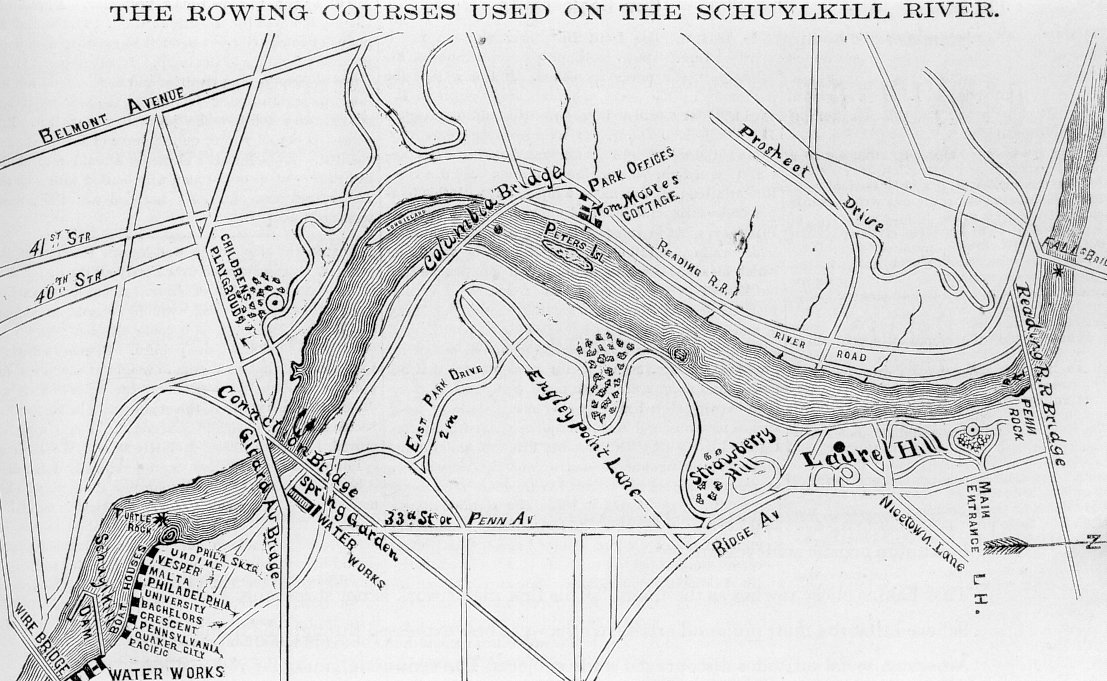
Schuylkill River Rowing Course (1872)

In 1870 the four top rowers in the Schuylkill Navy all belonged to the Pennsylvania Barge Club: Schmitt; Charles Brossman (who had won the title in 1868, and beaten Schmitt in the 4-mile race in September 1867); Austin Street (who had placed second in 1868); and John Lavens, Jr. They were the four competitors in the October championship race.

The course was three miles long: beginning near Turtle Rock (Turtle Rock Light is the lighthouse at the northwest end of Boathouse Row), proceeding upriver under the Girard Avenue and Pennsylvania Railroad Connecting Bridges to a stake near the Columbia Railroad Bridge, making a 180-degree turn around the stake, and then heading downriver back to the starting line.

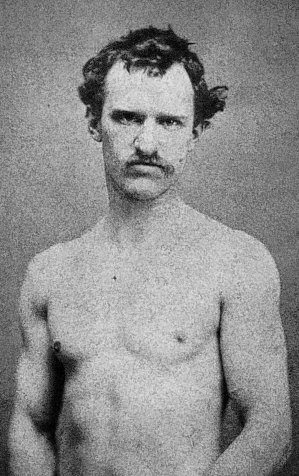
Max Schmitt (circa 1871)

Starting well together, Schmitt soon drew ahead followed by Street, Brossman and Lavens. When under the Girard Avenue Bridge, Brossman and Street fouled, the oars of one resting on the boat of the other. Schmitt was now three full lengths ahead. Street and Brossman again fouled in the attempt of the former to turn the eastern stake, thus crossing Brossman's bow. Schmitt had no trouble in maintaining the advantage he had gained, and won easily.

Schmitt not only re-established himself as the pre-eminent rower on the Schuylkill River, he set a new record, completing the three-mile, one-turn course in 20:00 minutes.

Schmitt did not defend his title the following year, and Lavens won with a time of 19:59 minutes, shaving one second off Schmitt's record. Schmitt raced one-on-one against Lavens for the single-sculls championship in 1872, and won (but did not beat Lavens's record). Schmitt sat out 1873, and Lavens won again. The two raced one-on-one again in 1874, and Schmitt won again. Having regained the championship (but not the record) and never having been defeated by Lavens, Schmitt retired from single-sculls competition. But that same year, he and Lavens joined forces to help win the Four-Oared Shell competition for the Pennsylvania Barge Club. Another Eakins painting (unfinished) may commemorate that June 17, 1874, victory.

== The painting ==
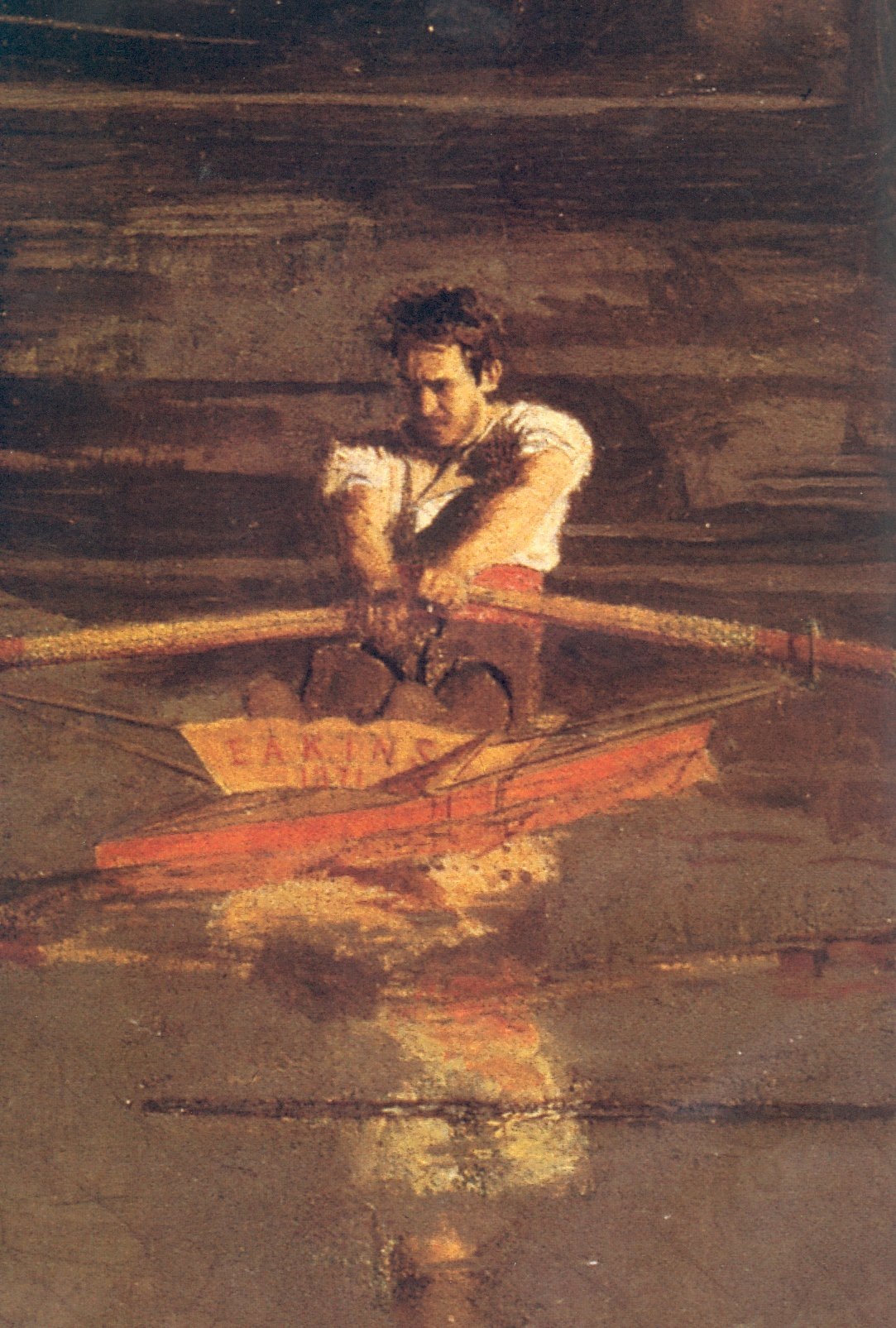
Detail: Eakins's self-portrait

Eakins returned to Philadelphia in July 1870, following four years of study at the École des Beaux-Arts in Paris. He was a witness to Schmitt's victory in October. The painting's composition echoes the event by reproducing the weather conditions and position of the sun at the date and time of Schmitt's triumph. Rather than in the midst of the competition, Schmitt is depicted nearly at rest – dragging his oars with the disappearing eddies of his course visible in the water. The location is just downstream of the Columbia Railroad Bridge, the site of the turn in the race.

Eakins, a keen oarsman himself who "was especially fascinated by rowing as a strenuous image expressive of physical as well as moral discipline", painted himself as the rower in the middle distance. He signed the painting – "Eakins, 1871" – on the stern of his scull. This was the first of his almost 30 rowing works – sketches, oil paintings, watercolors, perspective drawings – created by the end of 1874.

The painting shows the influences of his tutors in France, Jean-Léon Gérôme and Léon Bonnat, and of Diego Velázquez, the Spanish artist.

== The reception ==
The painting was exhibited only once during Eakins's lifetime; at the Union League of Philadelphia for four days in April 1871. The reviews were mixed. From the Philadelphia Bulletin:

The latter artist [Eakins], who has lately returned from Europe and the influence of Gérôme, has also a picture entitled 'The Champion Single Sculls' (No. 137), which, though peculiar, has more than ordinary interest. The Artist, in dealing so boldly and broadly with the commonplace in nature, is working upon well-supported theories, and despite a somewhat scattered effect, gives promise of a conspicuous future.

From the Philadelphia Inquirer:

Thomas Eakins shows two, a portrait and a river scene, entitled 'The Champion Sculls.' While manifesting a marked ability, especially in the painting of the rower in the foreground, the whole effect is scarcely satisfactory. The light on the water, on the rower and on the trees lining the bank indicates that the sun is blazing fiercely, but on looking upward one perceives a curiously dull leaden sky.

An assessment from 2007:

This painting, the first of 24 rowing paintings that Eakins completed over the course of four years, was the first time rowing was the focus of serious art. However, the stuffy Philadelphia critics didn't take well to Eakins' subject matter, even though rowing was, at the time, one of the most popular sports. A critic remarked that his subject matter was 'a shock to the artistic conventionalities of the city'.

== Provenance ==
Eakins gave the painting to his friend Max Schmitt. Following Schmitt's 1900 death, his widow owned it until 1930, when she sold it Susan Macdowell Eakins, the artist's widow. Mrs. Eakins consigned it to Babcock Galleries, New York City, where it failed to find a buyer. In 1934 it was purchased from Milch Galleries, New York City, by the Metropolitan Museum of Art.

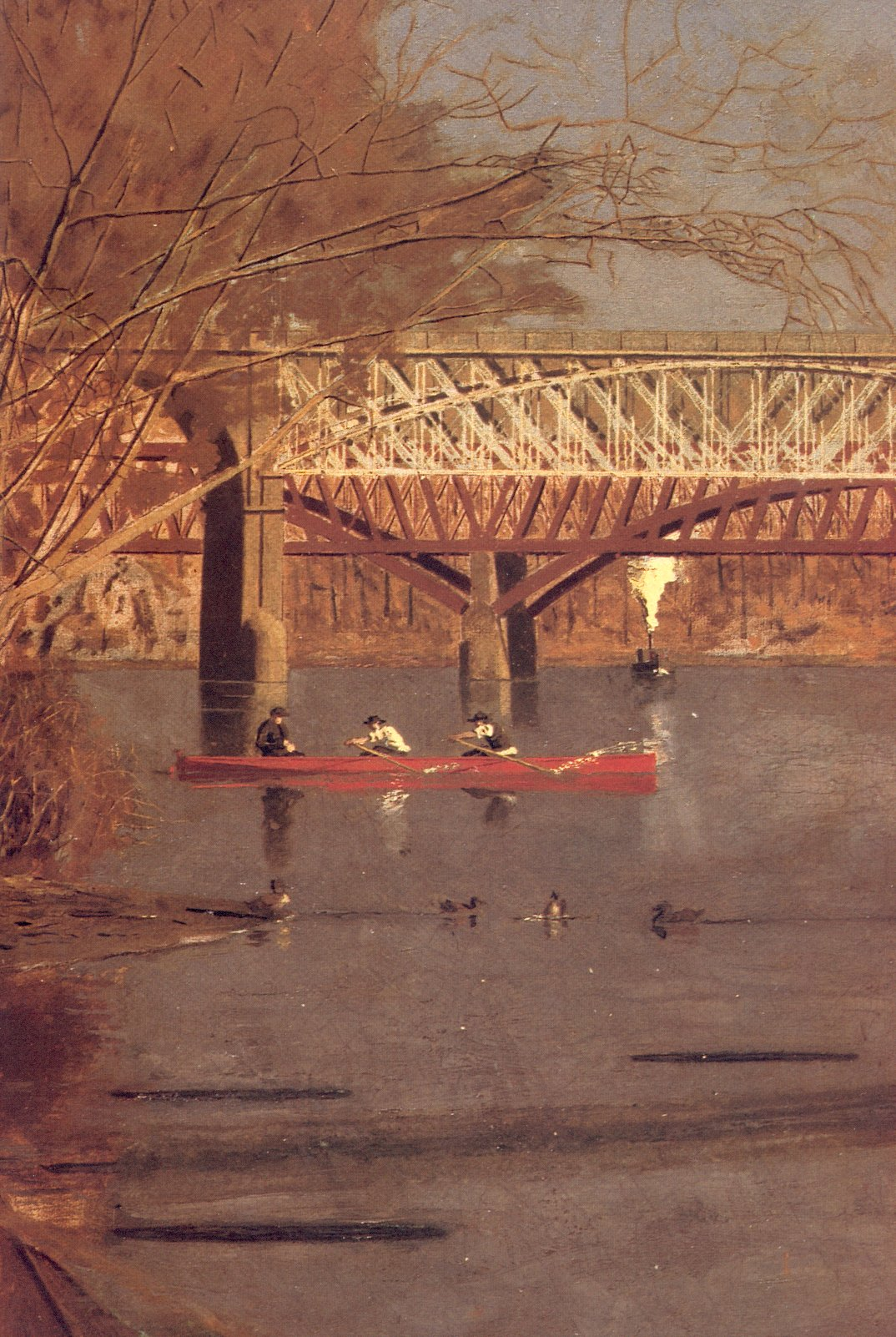
Detail: Pennsylvania Railroad Connecting Bridge, with Girard Avenue Bridge beyond

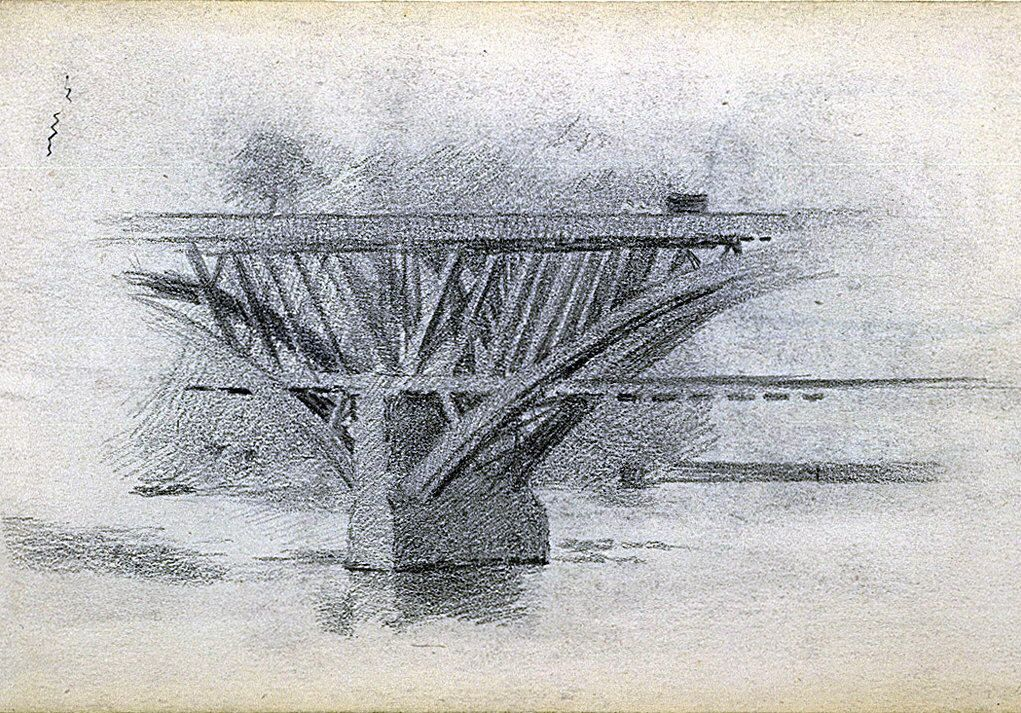
G-44A Eakins's drawing of the Girard Avenue Bridge, Hirshhorn Museum and Sculpture Garden

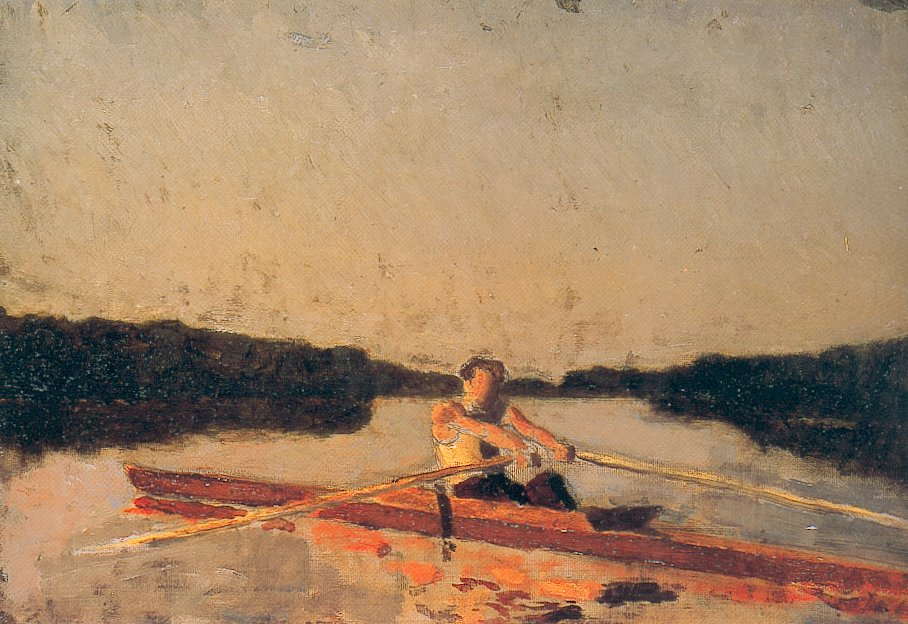
G-64 Sketch of Max Schmitt (circa 1870–71), Philadelphia Museum of Art

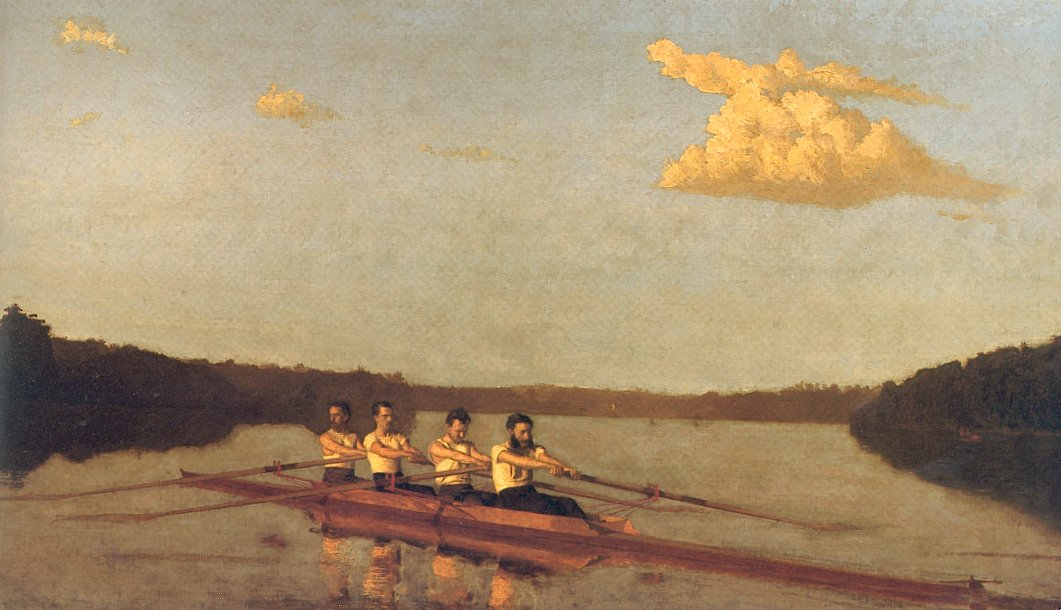
G-63 Oarsmen on the Schuylkill (The Pennsylvania Barge Four) (circa 1874), Brooklyn Museum. From right to left: John Lavens, Jr. (stroke), Max Schmitt, Frank Henderson, Oscar F. West (bow).

== See also ==
- List of works by Thomas Eakins
- 100 Great Paintings, 1980 BBC series
