= Malta Boat Club =

Coordinates: 39.96962°N 75.18534°W

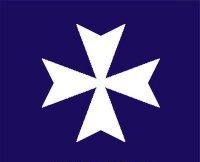
- Location: #9 Boathouse Row, Philadelphia, Pennsylvania, U.S.
- Home water: Schuylkill River
- Established: 1860
- Navy admission: 1865
- Key people: Phil Marcella (President); Jeff Cutler (Captain); Chuck Patterson (Navy delegate)
- Colors: Royal Blue and White
- Website: maltaboatclub.com
- Malta Boat Club
- U.S. Historic district – Contributing property
- Philadelphia Register of Historic Places
- Location within Pennsylvania Location within the United States
- Location: Philadelphia, Pennsylvania
- Part of: Boathouse Row (ID87000821)
- Added to NRHP: February 27, 1987

Malta Boat Club is an amateur rowing club located at #9 Boathouse Row in the historic Boathouse Row of Philadelphia, Pennsylvania. In 1865, the Club joined the Schuylkill Navy when it relocated to the Schuylkill River from the Delaware River and purchased the facilities of the now defunct Excelsior Club. While on the Delaware, the club occupied a house on Smith’s Island where the club stored its boat called the "Minnehaha". The club was founded by members of the Minnehaha Lodge of the Sons of Malta. The Sons of Malta, originally organized in the South, did not survive the Civil War.

As four members of the US National Team row out of Malta, the club was well represented at the 2009 World Championships.

== The Boathouse ==
In 1873, Malta, in conjunction with Vesper Boat Club, built a 1 1/2-story boat house. In 1880, the boat house was expanded.

In 1901, brothers George W. and William D. Hewitt designed more substantial additions including a third story to make Malta the tallest boathouse on Boathouse Row. The Hewitt brothers had been Frank Furness's partner until 1876, and they designed The Bellevue-Stratford Hotel, the Bourse Building, and the Wissahickon Inn.

== US National Team Athletes ==
1970s

- Stan Depman
- Fred H. Duling
- Rick Stehlik

1980s

1990s

- Fred S. Duling
- Tom Loughlin
- Marc Millard

2000s

- Sam Cunningham
- Shane Madden
- Marc Millard
- Rich Montgomery

2010s

- Sam Cunningham
- Bob Duff
- Colin Ethridge
- Christopher Lambert
- Shane Madden
- Tyler Nase
- David Smith

== Photo gallery ==
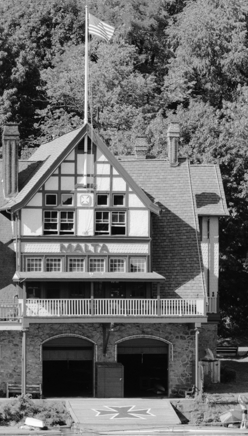
Malta Boat Club, #9 Boathouse Row in 1972.

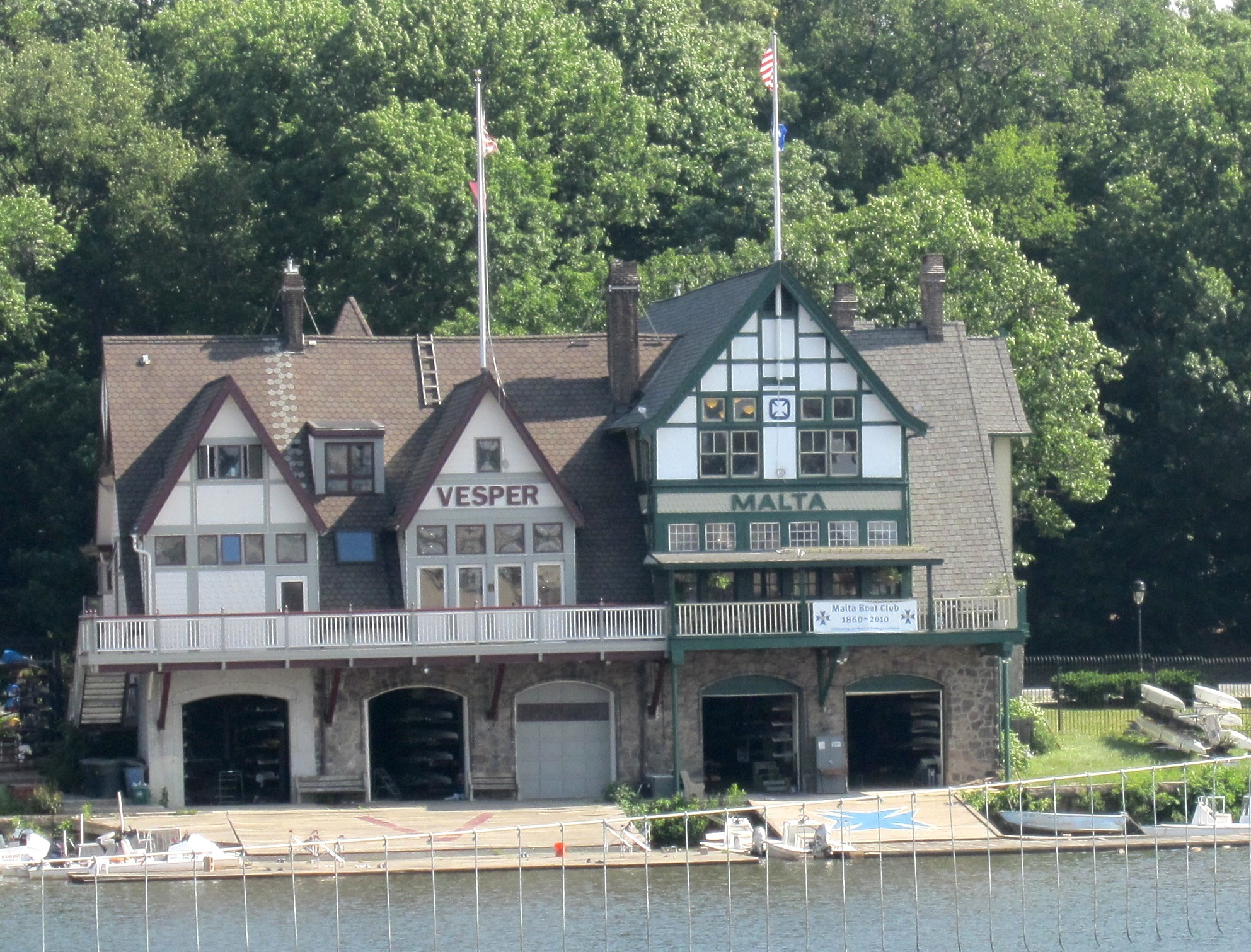
Vesper and Malta Boat Clubs, #9-10 in 2010.
