= Stotesbury Cup =

American high school rowing regatta

Stotesbury Cup Regatta
- Location: Schuylkill River
- Event type: High school rowing race
- Distance: 1,500 meters
- Established: 1927
- Organizer: Schuylkill Navy
- Website: stotesburycupregatta.com

The Stotesbury Cup Regatta, sponsored by the Schuylkill Navy, is the world's oldest and largest high school rowing competition. It is held annually in mid-May over a two-day period on the Schuylkill River near Boathouse Row in Philadelphia, Pennsylvania. Competing crews come from schools all over North America, though most hail from the Northeastern and Mid-Atlantic United States.

The regatta has many different events (31 in 2022) in which high school crews compete for various cups and trophies. Events vary by sex, age, weight category, number of rowers, and discipline of rowing (whether sweeping with one oar per rower or sculling with two oars per rower). The regatta takes its name from the Boys Senior Eight race, one of the premier events at the regatta, in which crews of eight oarsmen and one coxswain compete for the Stotesbury Cup. The Stotesbury Cup in turn is named for Edward T. Stotesbury of Philadelphia, a prominent partner at J.P. Morgan & Co. and its Philadelphia affiliate, Drexel & Co. The Girls Senior Eights compete for the Robert Engman Trophy. The regatta has been running boys races since 1927; girls events were added in the mid-1970s. Powerhouse schools in boys events include Episcopal Academy, Christian Brothers Academy, St. Augustine Preparatory School, LaSalle High School, Jesuit College Preparatory School of Dallas, Holy Spirit, Walt Whitman High School (Maryland), Atlantic City High School, St. Albans School (Washington, D.C.), The Haverford School, St. Joseph's Prep, Gonzaga College High School, Winter Park High School, St. Joseph's Collegiate Institute and Roman Catholic High School for Boys.

Currently, St. Joseph's Prep has won the Stotesbury Cup more than any other school with 15 wins of the Boys Senior 8+. St. Joseph's Prep additionally is the only school to sweep all the boys 8+ events having done it in 1997, 2008, 2023 and 2024. Gonzaga College High School, winner of the previous five Boys Senior Eight events from 2012 to 2016, was overtaken by Montclair High School for first place in the Boys Senior Eight. Meanwhile, in Girls events, National Cathedral School (Washington, D.C.) has won the Senior Eight category twice (2016-2017) and finished second once (2014) in the last four years.

The Boys Lightweight 8 category for the James R. Muldowney Memorial Trophy has been dominated by St. Joseph's Prep. On May 18, 2019, they won for the 10th consecutive time (2010-2019) and the 20th time in the last 23 years. Mount Saint Joseph Academy has also emerged in recent years with strong showings in the Lightweight Eight and Senior Eight categories and Bishop Eustace Preparatory School won the Senior Eight category for three consecutive years (2007-2009). Merion Mercy Academy having won Silver in 2016 in the Girls Senior Eight won Gold in both the Girls Senior Four and Lightweight Eight in 2017.

== Racecourse ==
The Stotesbury racecourse is the standard high school length of 1500 meters. It begins a few hundred meters upstream from the Strawberry Mansion Bridge and finishes downstream just before the Columbia Railroad Bridge. It is a six-lane course, and as in most races the favored crews are positioned in the middle lanes (lanes 2, 3, and 4). The river current is strongest in the final four hundred meters of the race as crews pass Peters Island on the west side of the course. Lanes 5 and 6, closest to Peters Island, along with lane 1, on the opposite shore, generally have the slowest water current, making them the least desirable lanes in this downstream racecourse.

== Organization ==
Like most similar regattas, each event begins with a time trial, similar to a head race, with results being determined by who has the fastest time. The starting order is based on the finish order from the previous year's regatta. The fastest crews in each time trial advance to the semi-final round. Semi-finals begin later on the first day and continue on the second day. Finals begin in the afternoon of the second day. Events are ordered so that small boats race before the larger ones, and the regatta culminates in either the Boys or Girls Senior Eight final race, alternating every year. After each final is finished, the best three boats dock at the grandstands next to the finish line to receive their medals. The 2nd and 3rd place boats receive their medals while sitting and the boat, and the first place boat goes up on to the dock to receive their medals and trophy.

The Stotesbury Cup Regatta continues to grow in its size and level of competition as high school rowing gains popularity. In 2000, about 3,500 athletes competed in the regatta. In 2016, 5,679 athletes from 191 schools competed in 984 boats to make it the largest Stotesbury yet. As the sport continues to grow, this trend will likely persist as more and more rowers carry on the Stotesbury tradition.
