= Turtle Rock Light =

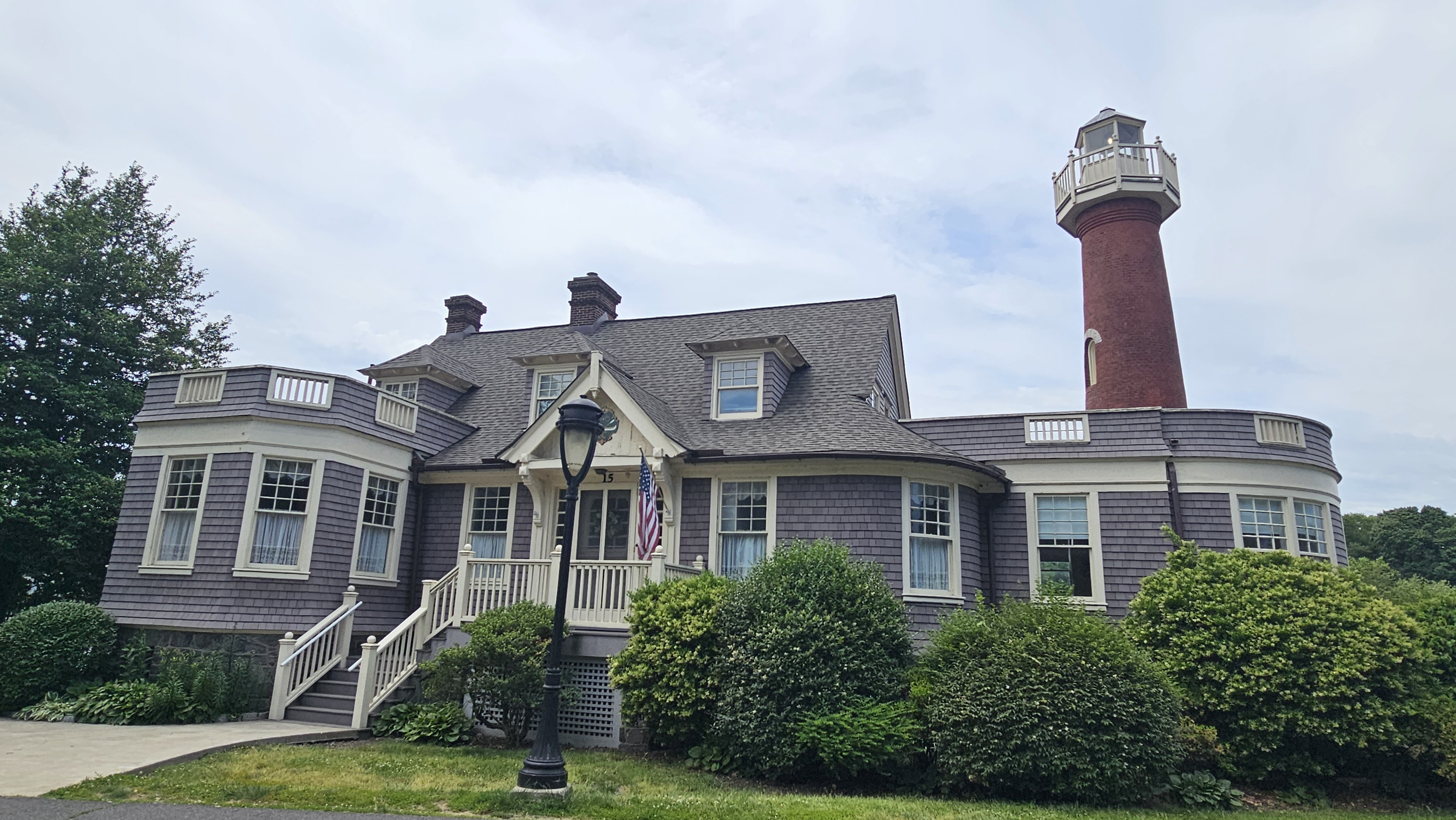
- The lighthouse in 2023
- Location: Kelly Drive, Boat House #15, Philadelphia, Pennsylvania, United States
- Coordinates: 39°58′12″N 75°11′23″W

Tower
- Constructed: 1887
- Foundation: Natural
- Construction: Brick
- Automated: 1990
- Height: 30 feet (9.1 m)
- Shape: Conical, with hexagonal balcony
- Markings: Red tower with white balcony and lantern
- Heritage: National Register of Historic Places contributing property
- Boat House #15
- U.S. Historic district – Contributing property
- Philadelphia Register of Historic Places
- Architectural style: Colonial Revival, Shingle Style
- Part of: Boathouse Row (ID87000821)
- Designated CP: February 27, 1987

The Lighthouse on Turtle Rock is a lighthouse built in 1887 to aid traffic on the Schuylkill River near Philadelphia, Pennsylvania. The lighthouse was constructed by Frank Thurwanger at a cost of $2,663 on an area of land just west of Boathouse Row. The lighthouse has a hexagonal lantern room with an octagonal walkway. Gas was first used to power the light, but in 1990, when the lighthouse was repainted and received a new wooden balustrade and newel posts, the beacon was electrified.

== Sedgeley Club ==
The lighthouse is operated by the Sedgeley Club, a social club located at #15 Boathouse Row in the historic Boathouse Row along the Schuylkill River, which is listed on the National Register of Historic Places and designated a National Historic Landmark. In 1897, the club was founded as the Bicycle, Barge and Canoe Club, but quickly changed its name to the Sedgeley Club. The Club initially occupied #14 Boathouse Row, until 1902, when the Fairmount Park Commission permitted the Club to build its own boathouse. The building, designed by Arthur H. Brockie, was adapted to encompass the lighthouse that predates it. Brockie designed a shingle, Colonial Revival house. After completing this design, Brockie joined the University Barge Club in 1902.

World War II caused the Club to stop operating as an athletic facility. The Sedgeley Club still operates as a social club and is available to rent for private parties.

== Friends of Historic Sedgeley ==
In 2012, Friends of Historic Sedgeley, a 501(c)(3) corporation was established to maintain and preserve the Sedgeley Club building as a local and national historic landmark, and to promote the architectural and cultural significance of the boathouse and the lighthouse to the public through open houses and educational programs.

== Sources ==
- Charleton, James H (June 1985). "Boat House Row" (PDF). National Register of Historic Places Inventory—Nomination Form. Pennsylvania Historical and Museum Commission.
- Lighthouse Friends
- Lighthouse Digest
- Stillner, Anna (January 2005). "The Philadelphia Girls' Rowing Club: An Incremental Historic Structure Report". Theses (Historic Preservation). Archived from the original on July 25, 2010.
