= Crescent Boat Club =

Rowing club in Philadelphia, Pennsylvania

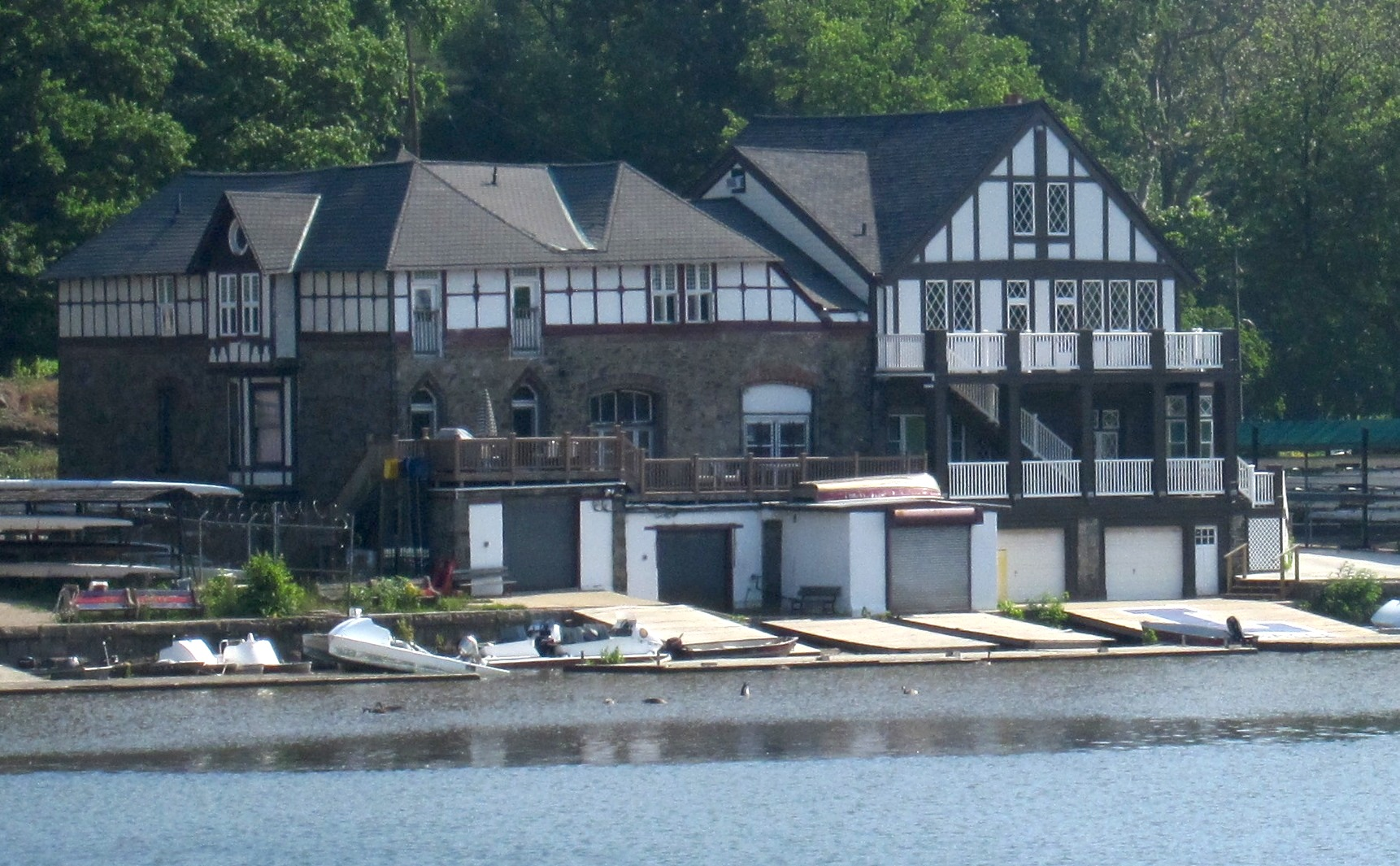
- Crescent Boat Club (right) and the Pennsylvania Barge Club (left) from the Schuylkill River, 2010
- Location: #5 Boathouse Row, Philadelphia, Pennsylvania, U.S.
- Home water: Schuylkill River
- Established: 1867
- Navy admission: 1868
- Former names: Pickwick Barge Club and Iona Barge Club
- Key people: Dan Povlich (President); Rich Hamilton (Vice-President); Keith Pellicone (Treasurer); Paul Howshall (Secretary); Gary Weilgus (Director of Rowing); Joe Leyland (Captain)
- Colors: Red and white
- Affiliations: Thomas Jefferson University; Harriton High School
- Website: crescentboatclub.org
- Crescent Boat Club
- U.S. Historic district – Contributing property
- Philadelphia Register of Historic Places
- Location within Pennsylvania Location within the United States
- Location: 5 Kelly Drive, Philadelphia, Pennsylvania
- Coordinates: 39.96930°N 75.18655°W
- Built: 1869–1871
- Architect: Charles Balderston (1890–1891 alterations)
- Architectural style: Late Victorian; half-timbered
- Part of: Boathouse Row (ID87000821)
- Added to NRHP: February 27, 1987

Crescent Boat Club is an American amateur rowing club at #5 Boathouse Row in Philadelphia, Pennsylvania. It was formed in 1867 by the merger of the Pickwick Barge Club and the Iona Barge Club, and was admitted to the Schuylkill Navy of Philadelphia in 1868.

The club occupies the upriver half of a double boathouse shared with the Pennsylvania Barge Club, built between 1869 and 1871 and enlarged in 1890–1891 to designs by the Philadelphia architect Charles Balderston. (Note: Sources differ. The National Register nomination records that the Pennsylvania Barge Club received permission to build in 1868 and that the double boathouse was erected jointly with Crescent in 1869–1871. The club's own history describes a building completed in 1868. The 1868 date appears to be the year permission was granted rather than the year of completion.) A transom over the ground-floor opening carries the date-stone "1867 Crescent 1891", recording the founding and the Balderston enlargement. The building is a contributing property to the Boathouse Row historic district, listed on the National Register of Historic Places in 1987 and designated a National Historic Landmark.

Crescent resigned from the Schuylkill Navy in 1951 and turned its boathouse over to the La Salle Rowing Association; the house stood vacant by 1974 before the club revived and reoccupied it. As of 2026 Crescent runs its own summer sculling programs and houses two resident crews, the Thomas Jefferson University women's team and the Harriton High School crew.

== History ==
=== Founding ===
Crescent Boat Club was formed in 1867 when the Pickwick Barge Club, founded in 1865, merged with the Iona Barge Club. According to the club, it received a charter from the City of Philadelphia to build on the riverbank below Lemon Hill, on ground that had formed part of an estate belonging to Robert Morris. Iona had itself been admitted to the Schuylkill Navy in 1867 and ended its separate membership on the merger; Crescent was admitted in its own right in 1868 and incorporated in 1874.

=== The first national regatta ===
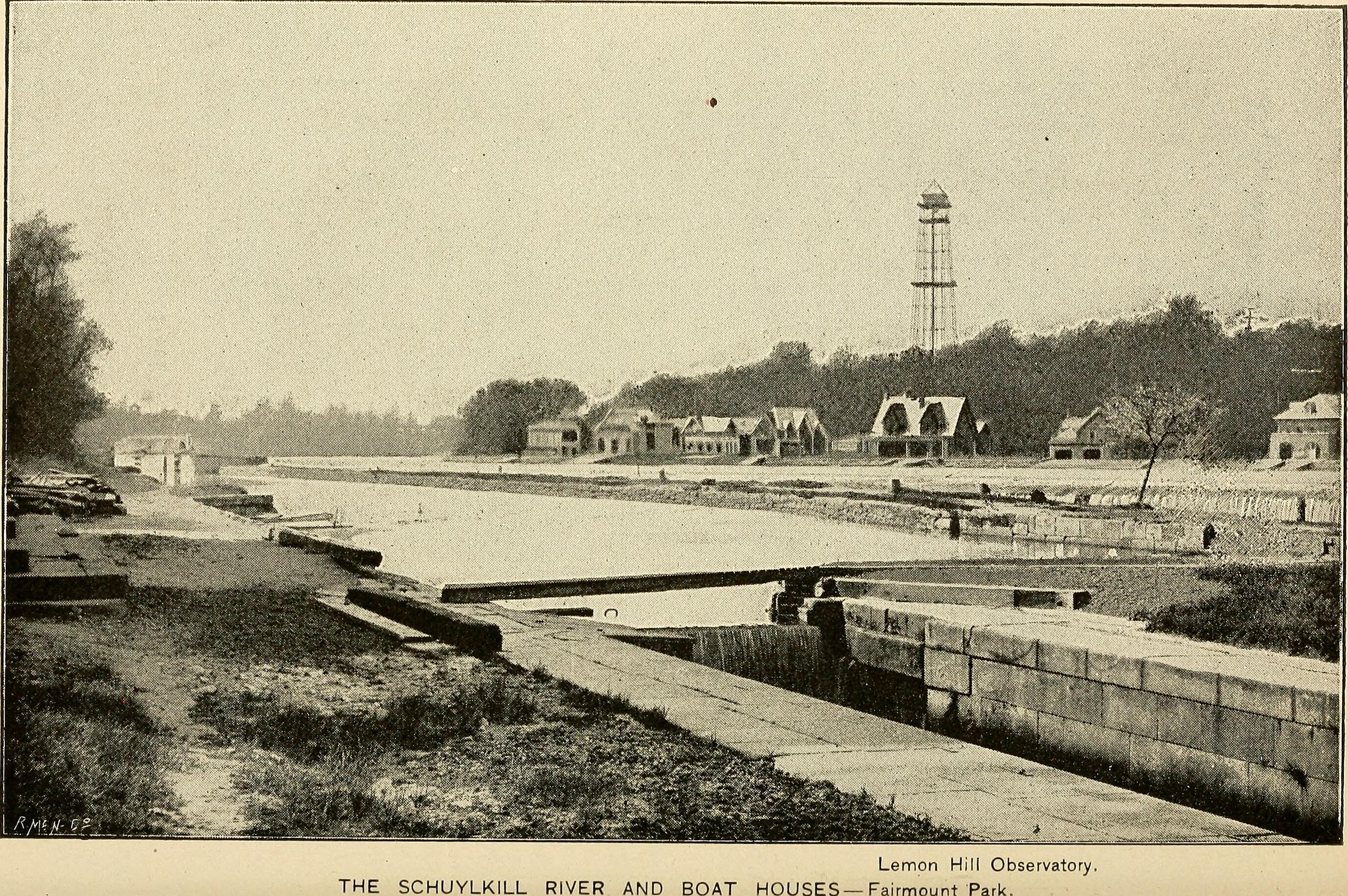
Boathouse Row in an 1900 guidebook engraving. Crescent stands at #5, sharing a double house with the Pennsylvania Barge Club at #4.

In October 1873 the National Association of Amateur Oarsmen held its first national championship regatta on the Schuylkill River at Philadelphia, the first regatta in the United States large enough to require heats. Crescent is recorded as a winner at that regatta, although sources differ on the event: Crowther and Ruhl credit the club with the double sculls, while the club's own history describes a win in the eights by three-quarters of a length over Undine and West Philadelphia. (Note: The National Association of Amateur Oarsmen was organized in 1872 and held its first national championship regatta in October 1873; an 1871 date, which appeared in earlier versions of this article, is not possible. Crowther and Ruhl are cited for a win in the double sculls, and the club's own history for a win in the eights at the same regatta. These are not necessarily inconsistent, as they describe different boat classes, but no contemporaneous newspaper report confirming which events Crescent won has been identified.) Crowther and Ruhl described the founding of a national amateur body as an event that helped the sport considerably.

Crescent also took part in what is generally described as the first eight-oared shell race rowed in the United States, contested against Undine on the Schuylkill in November 1872 in shells imported from the London Rowing Club. A silver-plated trophy mug inscribed for a Crescent four-oared shell race of May 25, 1895 survives in the collection of the Mystic Seaport Museum in Mystic, Connecticut, which holds a body of nineteenth- and twentieth-century Schuylkill rowing material.

=== Decline and revival ===
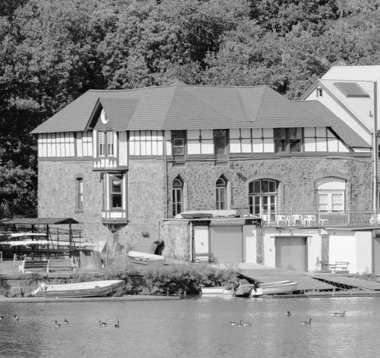
The boathouse in 1972, during the period when the National Register nomination records it as derelict

Membership fell sharply during and after World War II. In 1951 Crescent resigned from the Schuylkill Navy, ceased active operations, and turned its boathouse over to the La Salle Rowing Association, which occupied the house until 1960. (Note: The club's history refers to the tenant as the "LaSalle (College) Rowing Association." Available sources do not establish whether the body was connected to La Salle College, now La Salle University, or to La Salle College High School.) The National Register nomination records the boathouse as vacant by 1974.

By the club's own account, its revival began when John Wilkins—a member since the 1920s and later president—invited the coach Tom Rafferty to bring his high-school crew, then rowing from a warehouse dock in Manayunk, to #5. Rafferty and Steve Neczpor joined the club and rebuilt the house over the following years, working with salvaged materials while the crews trained. The club reports membership growth through novice, junior and masters programs from the 1970s onward.

Over the second half of the 20th century Crescent housed a number of collegiate and scholastic crews in addition to La Salle's, among them the Saint Joseph's University women's team and high-school teams from Northeast Catholic, Roman Catholic High School, Merion Mercy Academy, Archbishop Prendergast and Harriton.

== Boathouse ==
=== Construction, 1869–1871 ===
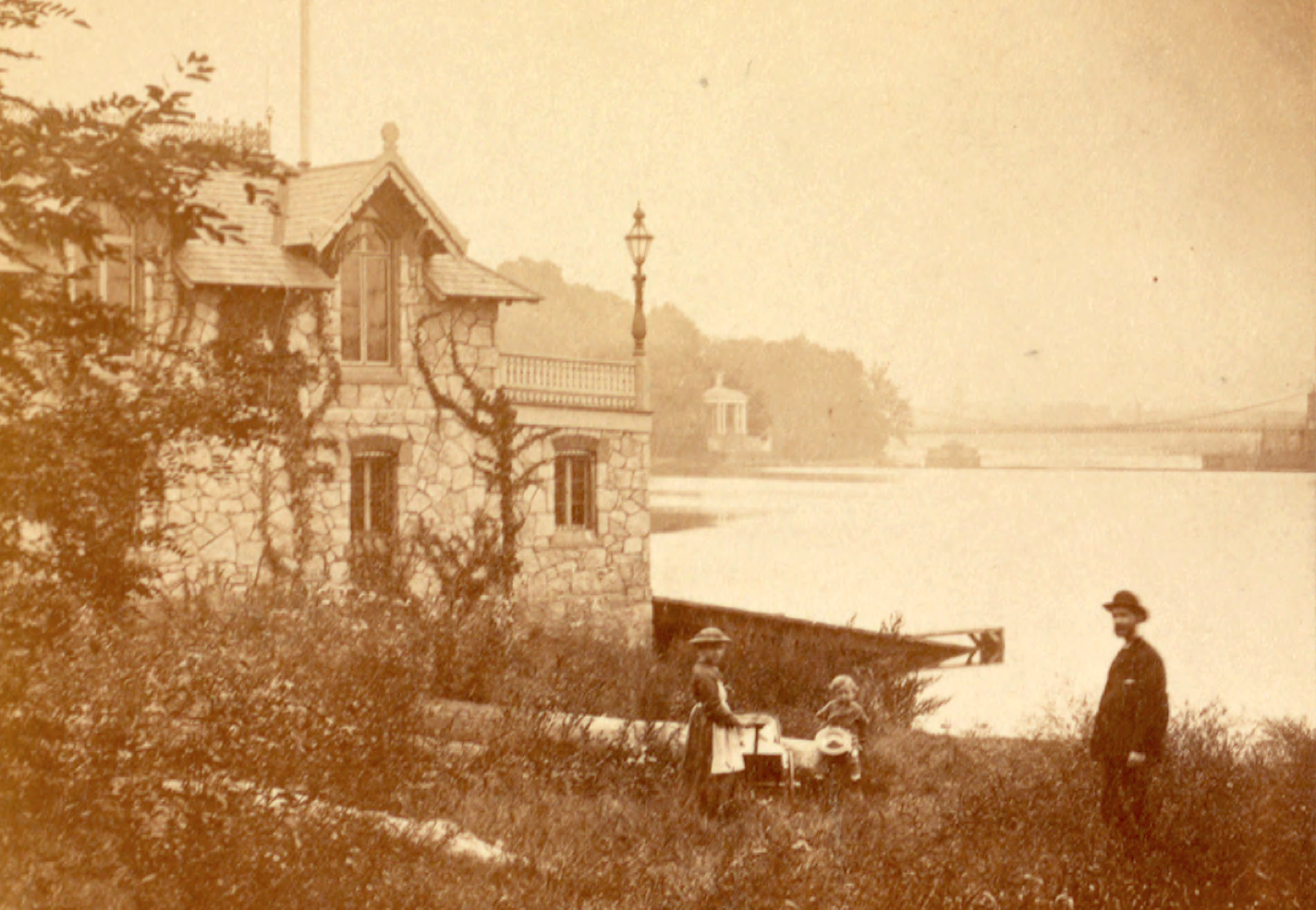
The boathouse in the 1870s, before the Balderston enlargement, photographed by James Cremer

The Pennsylvania Barge Club received permission from the Fairmount Park Commission to build at the site in 1868, and by the time work began Crescent had joined it in the project; the two clubs erected a stone double boathouse at #4 and #5 Boathouse Row between 1869 and 1871. The building had three boat bays at ground level with lockers and reception rooms above, and Crescent added a street-side tower. Charles S. Keyser's guide to Fairmount Park carries the earliest published description and engraving of the house. The club attributes the 1871 design to Davis Supplee, an architect and Crescent member; the National Register nomination names no architect for the original house, and no independent published source has been identified for the attribution.

=== Balderston enlargement, 1890–1891 ===
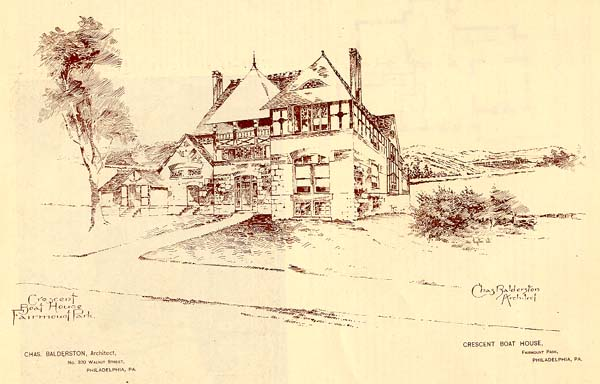
Balderston's preparation sketch for the 1890–1891 enlargement

By the late 1880s the club had outgrown the building. Crescent engaged the Philadelphia architect Charles Balderston (1852–1924), who raised the roof, added a further boat bay, and refaced the exterior in half-timbered brick and stucco above the original two stories of stone, with tall brick chimneys and eyebrow dormers. The work was carried out in 1890–1891; the date-stone reads 1891. Apart from an enlargement of the downriver boat bay in the 1960s to take 60-foot (18 m) eight-oared shells, Balderston's work defines the building's present footprint.

=== Foundations and settlement ===
The 1891 wing was built on pilings driven into silt that had accumulated behind the Fairmount Dam, and it settled toward the river; the reception-room floor falls by about nine inches from one side to the other. The club reports that improving water quality in the later 20th century renewed the deterioration of the pilings and that the building began to move again. Members have since mounted a preservation effort for the structure.

=== Lighting and river projects ===
The outline lighting that has illuminated Boathouse Row since 1979 was switched off in March 2023 and rebuilt at a cost of about $2.1 million, funded by the Joanna McNeil Trust and the City of Philadelphia. The new system, designed by The Lighting Practice for the Fairmount Park Conservancy, uses roughly 6,400 individually programmable LEDs and was relit in March 2024. With the fixtures removed, the boathouses collectively carried out around $850,000 of repairs and maintenance to the buildings.

The stretch of the Schuylkill in front of Boathouse Row, last dredged in 1999, was dredged again under a project for which the Schuylkill Navy raised $4.5 million from the city, the state, local universities, the William Penn Foundation and the rowing public. Work stalled in 2021 when the first contractor stopped after encountering large debris on the riverbed, and resumed under a new contractor in 2022.

== Programs and resident crews ==
As of 2026 Crescent coaches four summer sculling programs from the boathouse: a novice program, sculling development, junior racing, and an under-23 high-performance squad. Adult members row year round, and the club stores members' shells for a per-seat fee.

The club houses two resident crews. Thomas Jefferson University's women's team has rowed from Crescent since 2016, when the program—then Philadelphia University, which merged into Jefferson the following year—moved to Boathouse Row; it shared the house with other programs until becoming Crescent's sole tenant on July 1, 2021, under a lease running to 2029. Harriton High School's crew trains from the boathouse through the spring season. The boathouse is also let for private events and offered as a filming location.

== Notable members ==
- Glenn Ochal (born 1986), who began rowing in 2001 at Roman Catholic High School and Crescent Boat Club, won a bronze medal in the men's coxless four at the 2012 Summer Olympics and rowed in the men's eight at the 2016 Summer Olympics. He was named USRowing's Male Athlete of the Year for 2012.

== Gallery ==
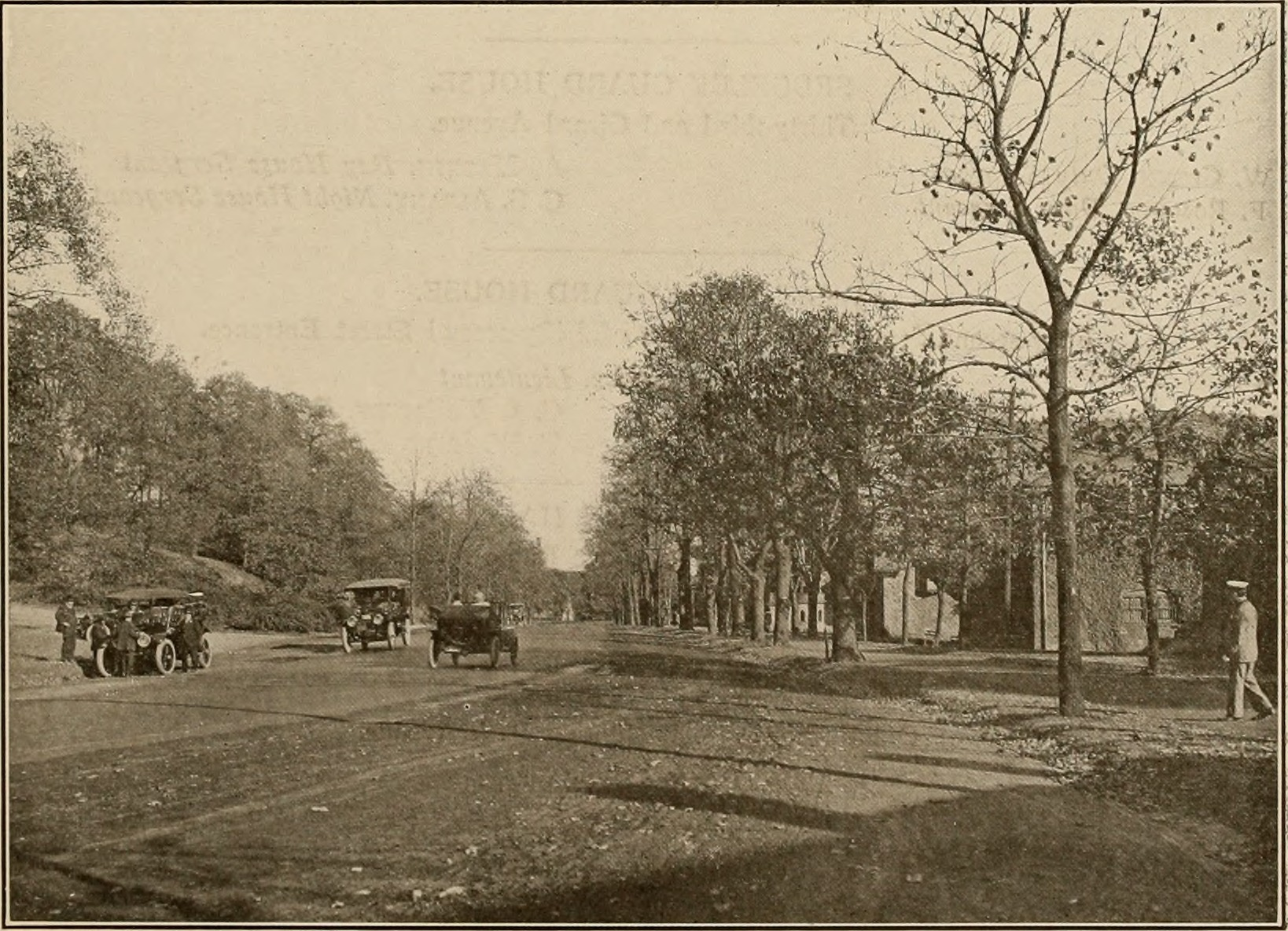
Boathouse Row c. 1917, Crescent at #5

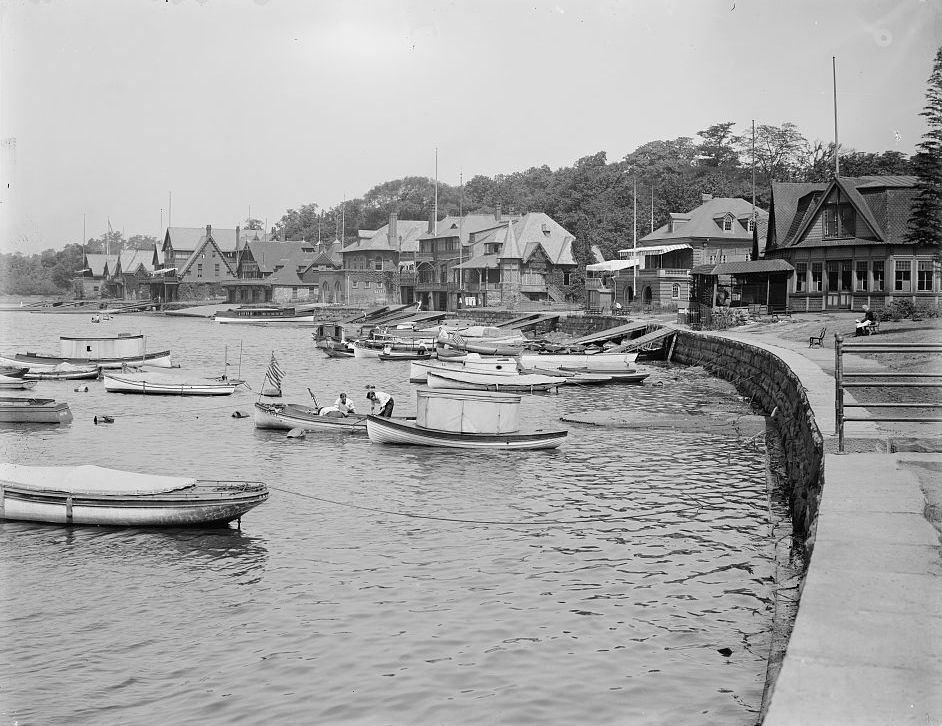
Boathouse Row, c. 1915, by the Detroit Publishing Company

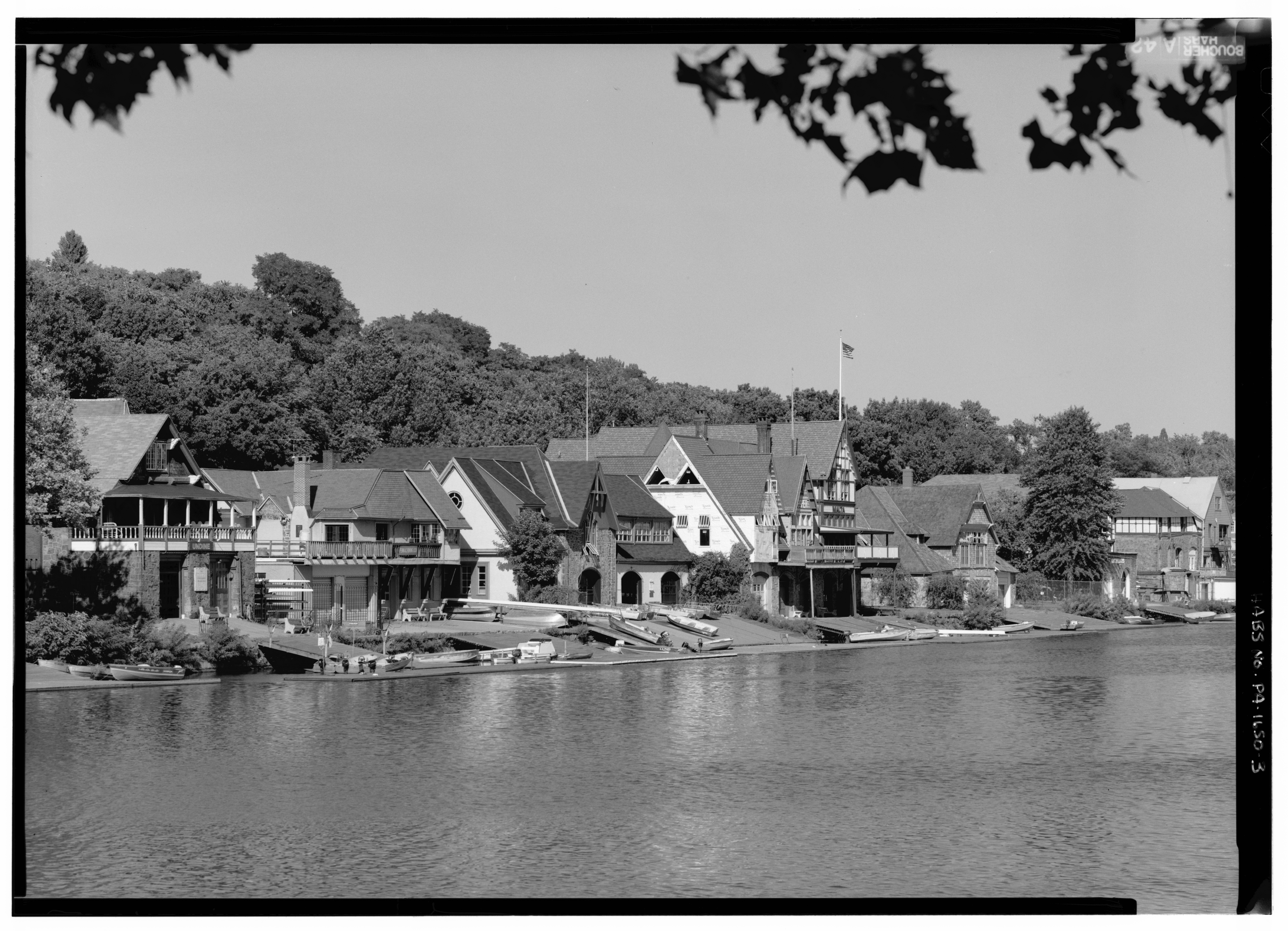
Historic American Buildings Survey record photograph, HABS PA-1650

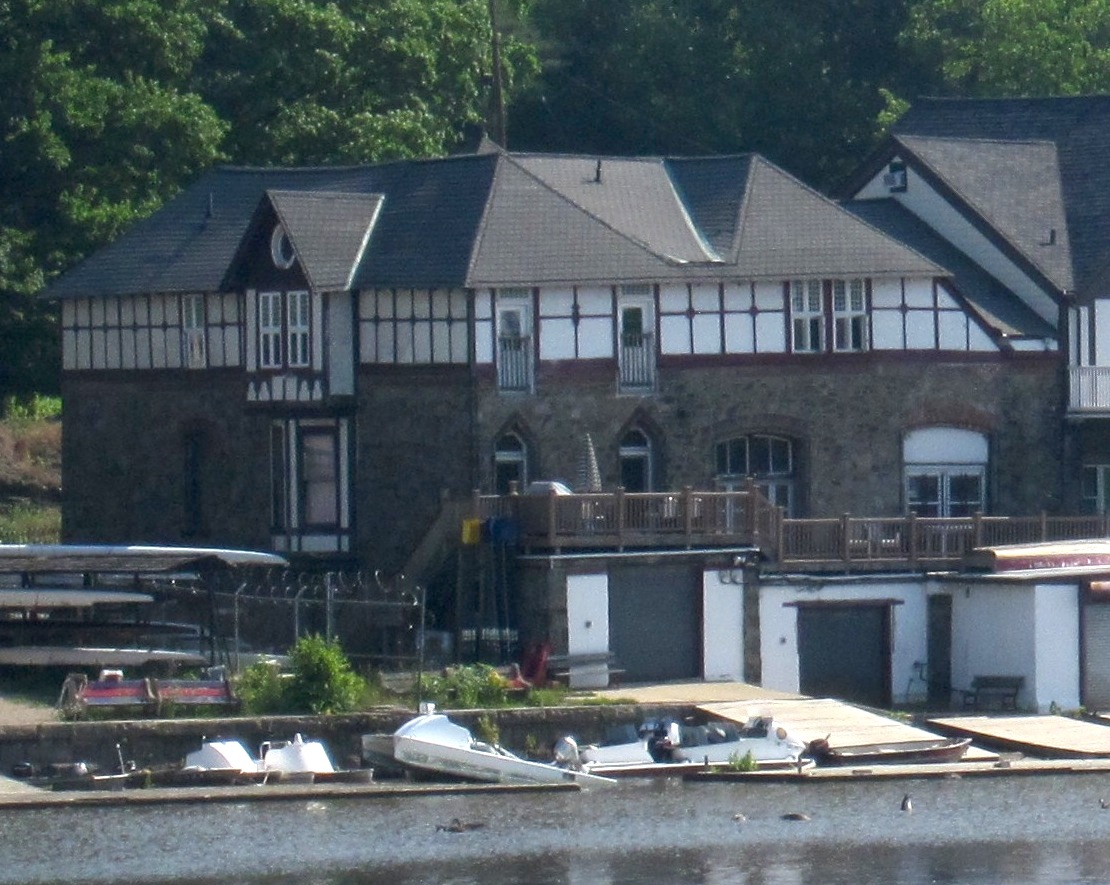
The boathouse in 2010

== See also ==
- Boathouse Row
- Schuylkill Navy
- Head of the Schuylkill Regatta
- Stotesbury Cup Regatta

== Works cited ==
- Brown, Dotty (2016). Boathouse Row: Waves of Change in the Birthplace of American Rowing. Philadelphia: Temple University Press. ISBN 978-1-4399-1282-9.
- Beischer, Thomas G. (2006). "Control and Competition: The Architecture of Boathouse Row". The Pennsylvania Magazine of History and Biography. 130 (3): 299–330.
- Heiland, Louis (1938). The Schuylkill Navy of Philadelphia, 1858–1937. Philadelphia: The Drake Press.
- Kain, Charles F. (1960). The Schuylkill Navy of Philadelphia, Volume II, 1938–1958. Philadelphia: Franklin Printing Company.
