= Philadelphia Girls' Rowing Club =

Coordinates: 39.96935°N 75.18537°W

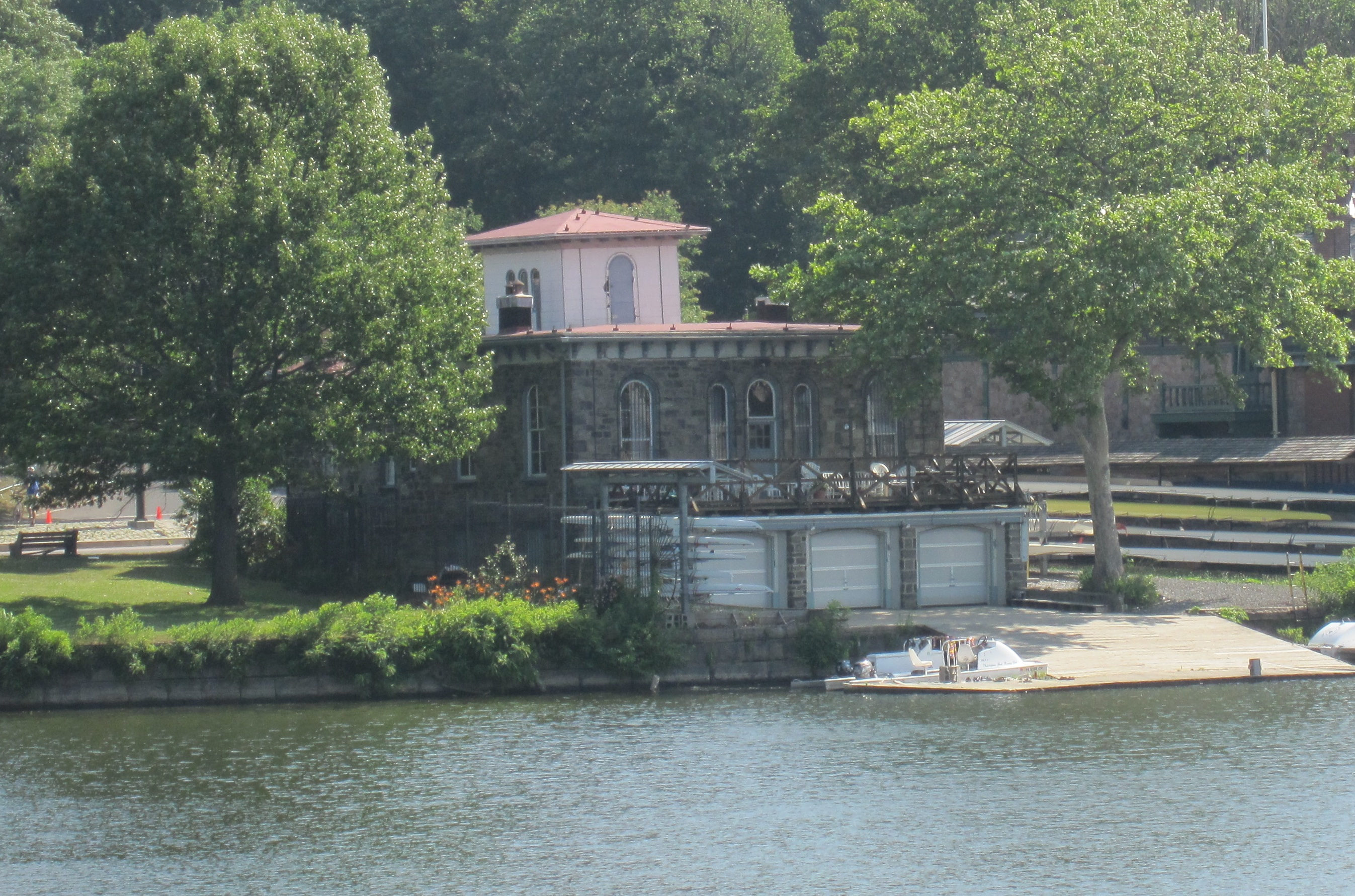
- Philadelphia Girls' Rowing Club, # 14 Boathouse Row
- Location: #14 Boathouse Row, Philadelphia, Pennsylvania, U.S.
- Home water: Schuylkill River
- Established: 1938
- Navy admission: 1967
- Key people: Sophie Socha (President)
- Colors: Royal Blue and White
- Affiliations: Agnes Irwin School
- Website: philadelphiagirlsrowingclub.com
- Philadelphia Girls' Rowing Club
- U.S. Historic district – Contributing property
- Philadelphia Register of Historic Places
- Location within Pennsylvania
- Location: Philadelphia, Pennsylvania
- Built: 1860
- Part of: Boathouse Row (ID87000821)
- Added to NRHP: February 27, 1987

Philadelphia Girls' Rowing Club (commonly abbreviated PGRC) is an amateur rowing club located at #14 Boathouse Row in the historic Boathouse Row along the Schuylkill River in Philadelphia, Pennsylvania. It is the oldest all-female rowing club in existence. Built in 1860, the club's boathouse is the oldest structure on Boathouse Row, which is listed on the National Register of Historic Places and designated a National Historic Landmark.

PGRC was founded in 1938 by seventeen women (mostly wives of oarsmen at other clubs) who wanted to participate in the then predominantly male sport of rowing.

== History of the boathouse ==
In 1860, Philadelphia City Council authorized construction of the structure that is now #14 Boathouse Row for the purpose of housing the Philadelphia Skating Club and Humane Society.

Architect, James C. Sidney, designed the building to provide for the Skating Club, but also included a basement facility to store boats for neighboring rowing clubs whose boat houses were scheduled to be removed by the city. Samuel Sloan, a well-known Philadelphia architect, likely influenced the design of #14 Boathouse Row with his rendering of "Italian Villa," Plate XXIV, in his book "Model Architect." The construction cost $4,900 and was completed in 1861.

The Undine and University Barge Clubs housed their boats at the Philadelphia Skating Club building until the city permitted them to build their own structures in 1882 and 1871, respectively. From 1884 through 1895, the second Iona Boat Club (now defunct) occupied the space in the building left vacant by Undine Barge Club.

With the advent of artificially frozen indoor skating rinks at the beginning of the 20th century, skating on the Schuylkill River declined precipitously. In 1965, PGRC purchased the boathouse from the Philadelphia Skating Club.

== Photo gallery ==
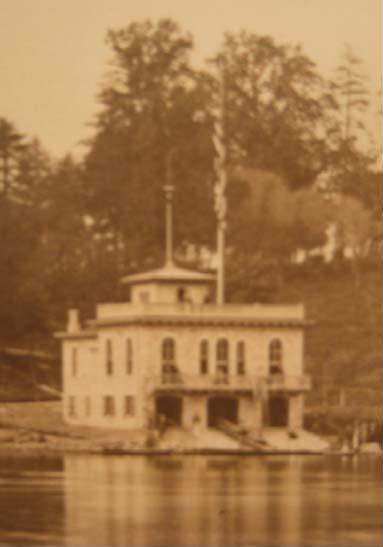
Philadelphia Girls' Rowing Club, #14 Boathouse Row in 1870.

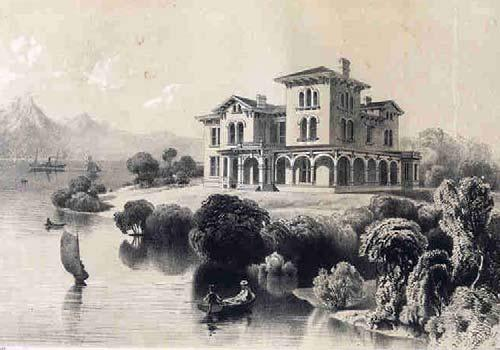
Samuel Sloan's "Italian Villa" lithograph that influenced the design of #14 Boathouse Row.

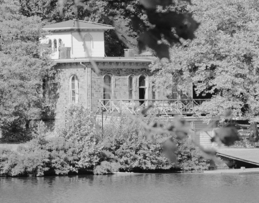
Philadelphia Girls' Rowing Club in 1972.

== See also ==
- Ernestine Bayer
