= Boathouse Row =

Coordinates: 39.969578°N 75.187478°W

- U.S. National Register of Historic Places
- U.S. National Historic Landmark
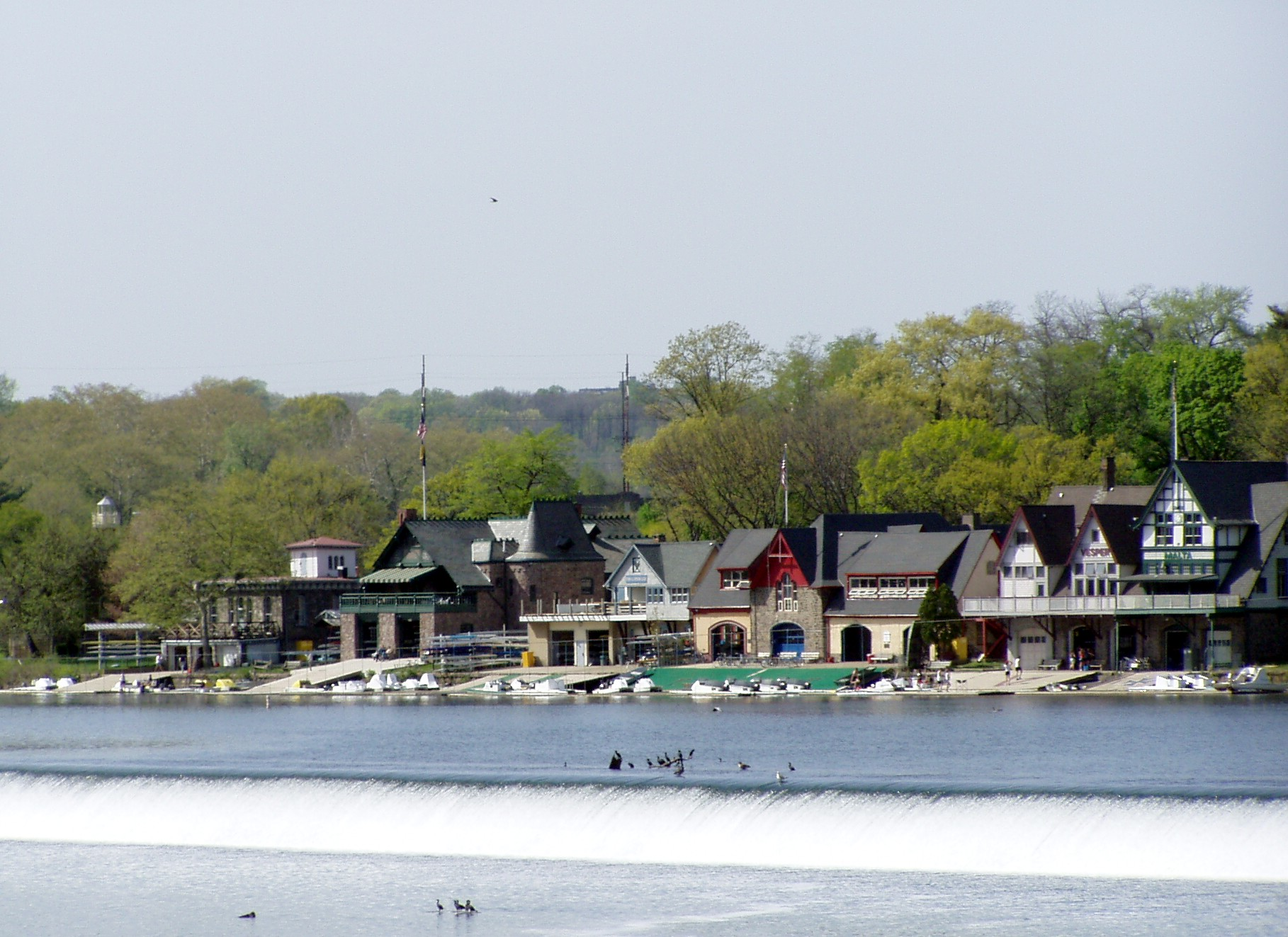
- Boathouse Row on the Schuylkill River in Philadelphia

- Location within Philadelphia Location within Pennsylvania Location within the United States
- Location: Philadelphia, Pennsylvania, U.S.
- Area: 12 acres (4.9 ha)
- Built: 1860
- Architects: Furness & Evans, et al.
- Architectural style: Late 19th- and 20th-century Revivals; Late Victorian; Gothic
- NRHP reference No.: 87000821

Significant dates
- Added to NRHP: February 27, 1987
- Designated NHL: February 27, 1987

Boathouse Row is row of fifteen boathouses on the east bank of the Schuylkill River in Philadelphia, Pennsylvania, housing social and rowing clubs and their racing shells. A historic site just north of the Fairmount Water Works and the Philadelphia Museum of Art, each of the boathouses has its own history, and all have addresses on both Boathouse Row and Kelly Drive, named after Philadelphia oarsman John B. Kelly Jr.

Boathouses #2 through #14 are part of a group known as the Schuylkill Navy, which encompasses several other boathouses along the river. Boathouse #1 is Lloyd Hall and is the only public boathouse facility on the Row. Boathouse #15 houses the Sedgeley Club, which operates the Turtle Rock Lighthouse. The boathouses are all at least a century old, and some were built more than 150 years ago.

== History and importance ==
Boathouse Row hosts several major rowing regattas, including the Philadelphia Scholastic Rowing Association's Manny Flick regatta series, the Stotesbury Cup Regatta, the Navy Day Regatta, the Independence Day Regatta, and the Head of the Schuylkill Regatta.

The boathouses are seen as centers of the rowing community around the United States. Rowers from the boathouses compete at every level, including local clubs, high schools, colleges, summer racing programs, and international-level athletics.

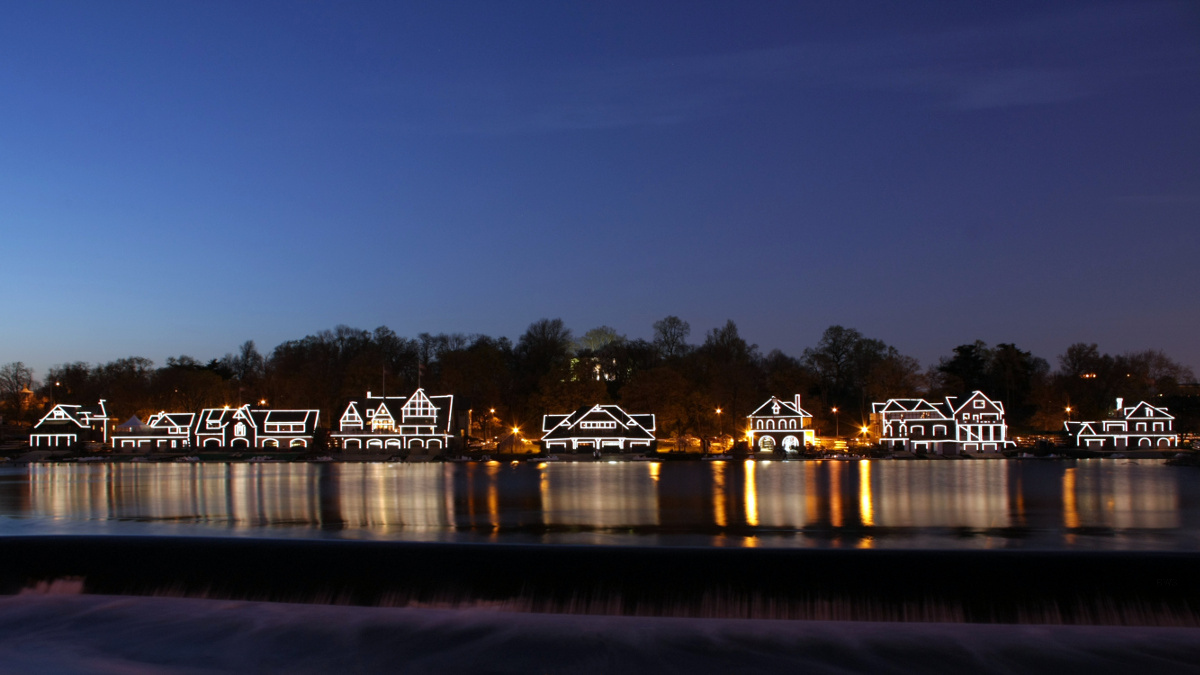
Boathouses outlined with LED lights

In 1979, lights designed by architectural lighting designer Ray Grenald were installed to outline each of the boathouses, giving them a nightly Christmas-like gingerbread house appearance and reflecting in the Schuylkill River. He proposed the lights after hearing talk of destroying the decaying Victorian boathouses. Lights on the buildings at night would serve to make them more noticed and appreciated. In 2005, after two refurbishings, the houses were outfitted with computerized LEDs that can light up in various colors, depending on the event or season.

Boathouse Row is a National Historic Landmark and was listed on the National Register of Historic Places in 1987.

Local universities including Drexel, Penn, Thomas Jefferson University and La Salle row out of houses on Boathouse Row. Temple and Saint Joseph's row out of other boathouses along the Schuylkill that are not part of the Row.

== Early 19th-century beginnings ==
The history of Boathouse Row begins with the construction of the Fairmount Dam and the adjacent water works. The Dam was built in 1821 to keep brackish tidal waters from entering the city's water supply through the Fairmount Water Works, which had been completed in 1815. The Lehigh Coal & Navigation Company would become heavily involved in the improvements. The dam initially submerged the rapids, and later developments transformed the stretch of the Schuylkill between the dam and East Falls from a tidal river into a slack water river resembling a very long freshwater lake. The placid man-made surface was ideal for ice skating in winter and rowing in summer.

In 1835, the first regatta took place between the Blue Devils and the Imps Barge clubs. The excitement from the race sparked the formation of several barge clubs, many of them short-lived.

== The frame boathouses ==
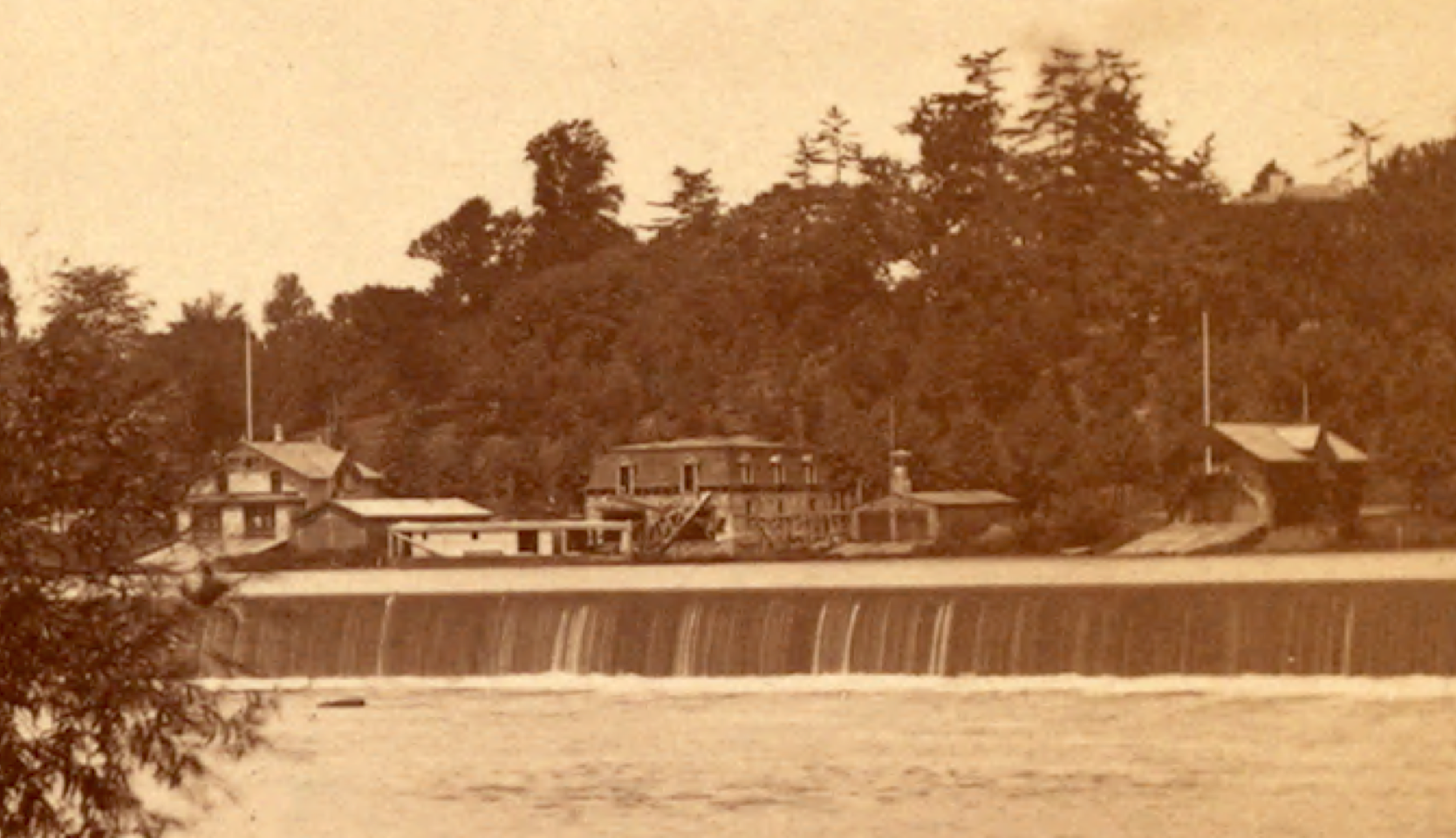
From left to right: double boathouse at#9–10; double house at #7–8; and #6, with one-story condemned buildings in between (c. 1873)

A secondary effect of taming the Schuylkill was that the calm water provided a breeding ground for mosquitoes, which drove wealthy residents from their riverside mansions. The abandoned estates were bought by the City of Philadelphia. In 1844, the city purchased the Lemon Hill Estate. The leaseholder of Lemon Hill operated a beer garden and allowed rowing and barge clubs to build frame structure boathouses on the Estate's property along the Schuylkill.

In 1855, the city founded Fairmount Park by converting the Lemon Hill Estate, upon which the frame boathouses were built, into a public park. At the same time, some of the established clubs wanted to regulate the sport of rowing to prevent unscrupulous practices and fixed races. As a result, in 1858, the Schuylkill Navy was founded, which eventually transformed the professional sport of rowing into an amateur sport. In 1859, the city condemned the boathouses along the Schuylkill.

== Boathouses of 1860 ==
Although the city condemned the frame boathouses, it passed an ordinance in 1860 to permit construction of three new boathouses for Pacific Barge Club, the clubs of the Schuylkill Navy, and the Philadelphia Skating Club. After 1860, without city approval, several clubs constructed one-story boathouses similar to the frame structures that the city had previously condemned and removed, but these newer boathouses were built with brick and stone. In 1868, following an expansion of Fairmount Park, the city ordered the removal of all of the one-story brick and stone boathouses except for buildings belonging to the Philadelphia Skating Club (#14 Boathouse Row), Pacific Barge Club (#2-3 Boathouse Row), and Bachelors Barge Club (#6).

== Post–Civil War boathouses ==
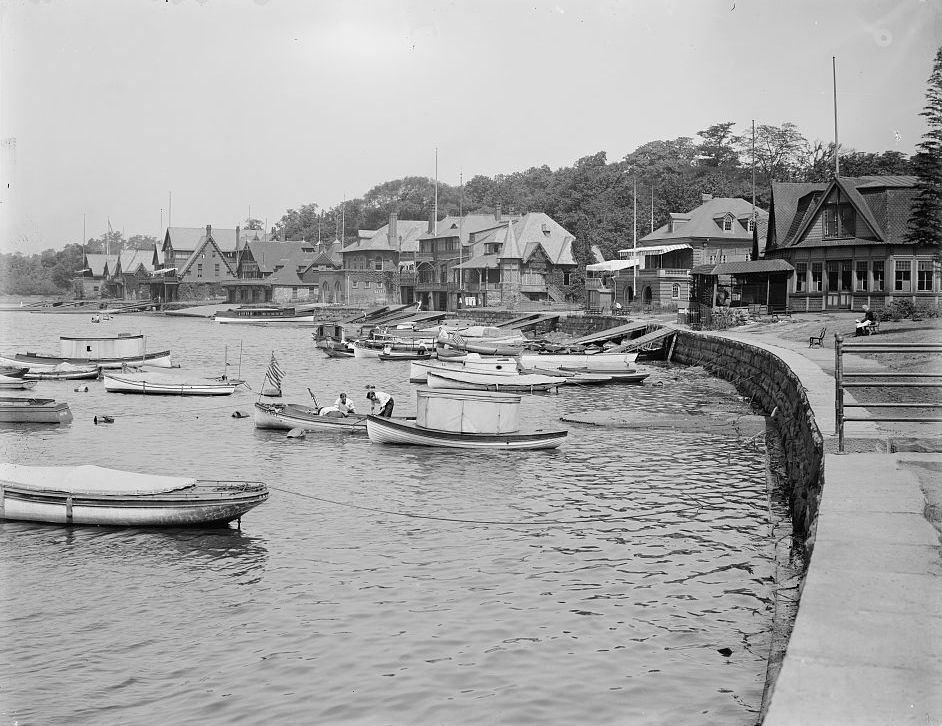
Boathouse Row, c. 1904–1912

Between 1869 and 1871, Pennsylvania Barge Club and Crescent Boat Club erected a double boathouse at #4 and #5 Boathouse Row. In 1871, the Fairmount Park commission allowed the University Barge Club and the Philadelphia Barge Club to build a double boathouse at #7-8 Boathouse Row. In 1873, Malta Boat Club and Vesper Boat Club built a double boathouse at #9 and #10 Boathouse Row. In 1874, College Boat Club built the boathouse at #11 Boathouse Row. In 1878, West Philadelphia Boat Club built #12 Boathouse Row.

Five years later, in 1883, Undine Barge Club constructed #13 Boathouse Row. In 1892, with Crescent's permission, Pennsylvania Barge Club tore down and replaced their half of the double boathouse at #4 Boathouse Row. In 1894, Bachelors Barge Club replaced its 1860 building at #6 Boathouse Row. In 1902, the Sedgeley Club was allowed to build #15 Boathouse Row. In 1904, Fairmount Rowing Association demolished the stone building built by Pacific Barge Club at #2 Boathouse Row and replaced the 1860 structure with a new brick structure, leaving #3 and #14 Boathouse Row as the only remaining boathouses dating from 1860.

== Photo gallery ==
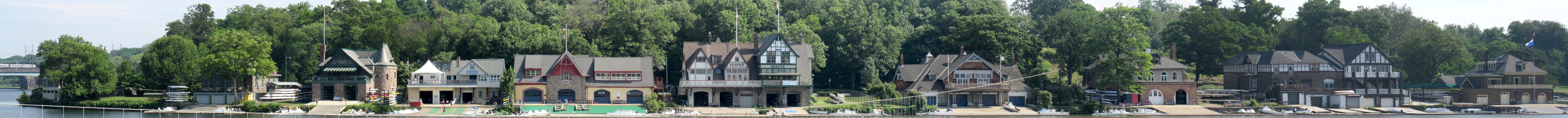
A panorama of #15 to #2 Boathouse Row taken from West Philadelphia in 2010

=== Historic Landmark Boathouses in 1972 ===
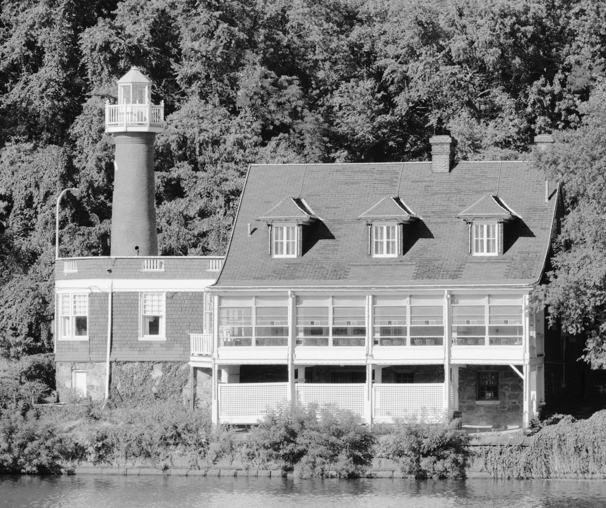
Sedgeley Club,
#15 Kelly Drive (1902)

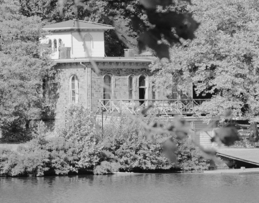
Philadelphia Girls' Club,
#14 Kelly Drive (1860)

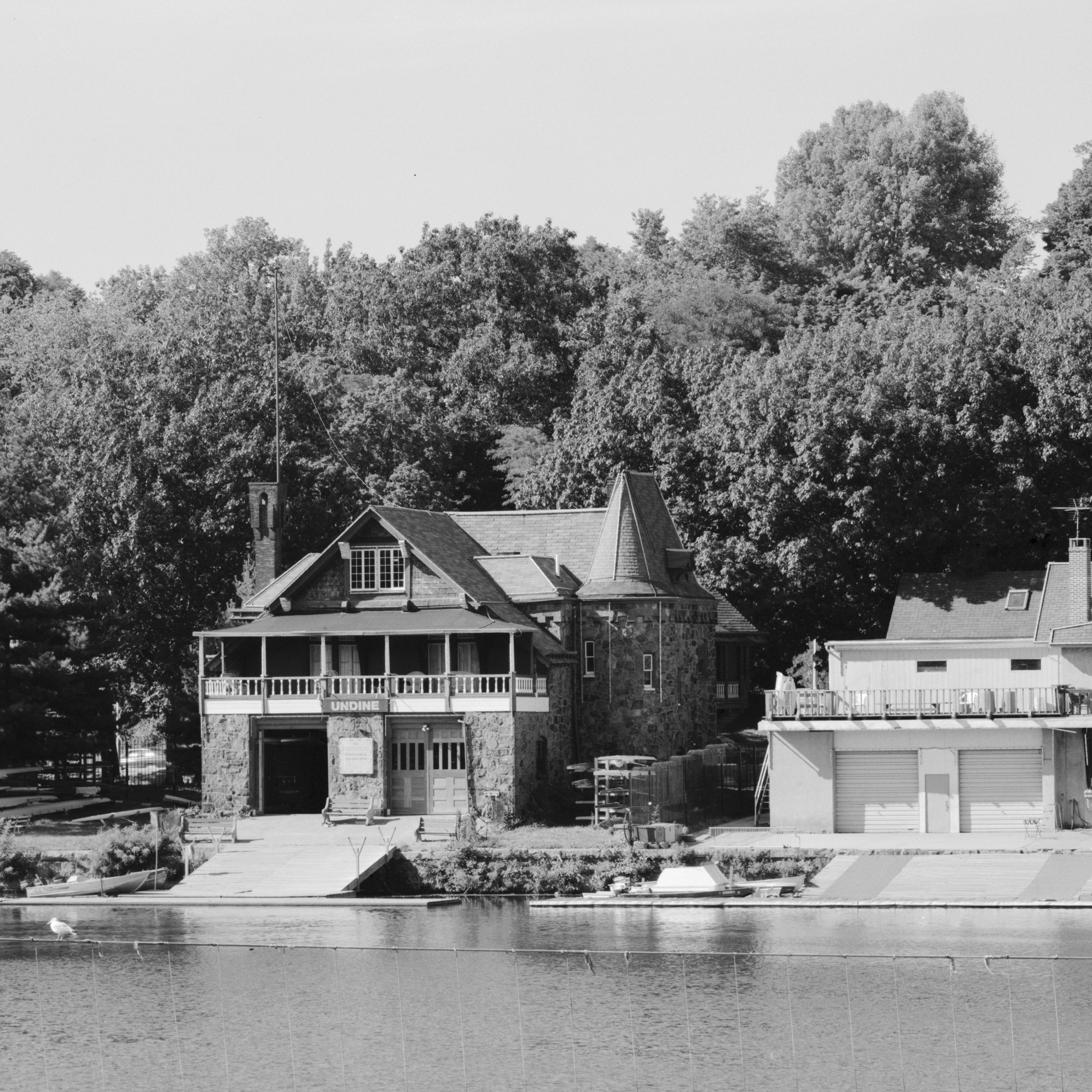
Undine Barge Club,
#13 Kelly Drive (1883)

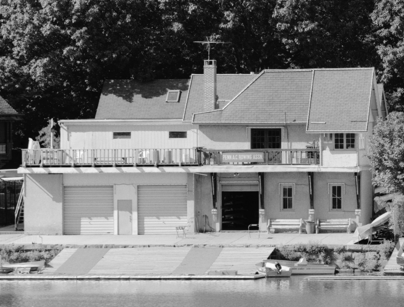
Penn AC Rowing Assoc.,
#12 Kelly Drive (1878)

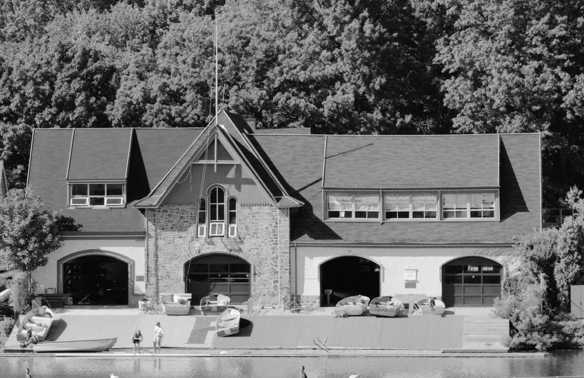
College Boat Club
Burk-Bergman Boathouse,
#11 Kelly Drive (1874)

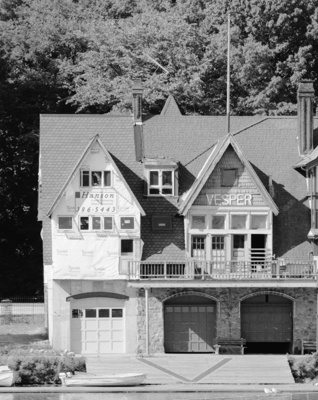
Vesper Boat Club,
#10 Kelly Drive (1873)

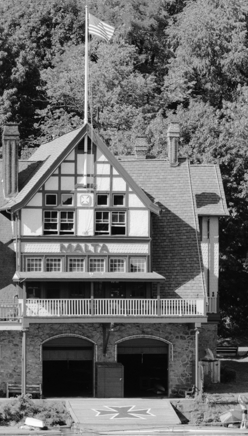
Malta Boat Club,
#9 Kelly Drive (1873)

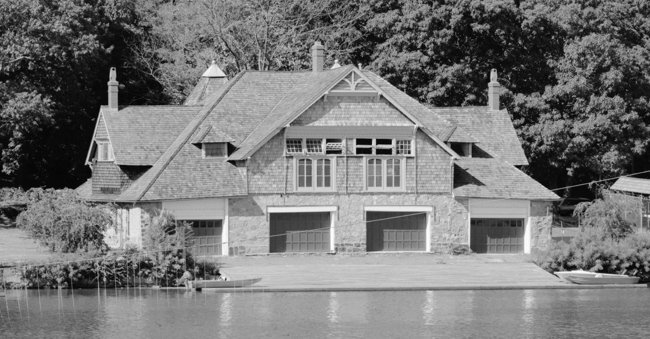
University Barge Club,
#7-8 Kelly Drive (1871)

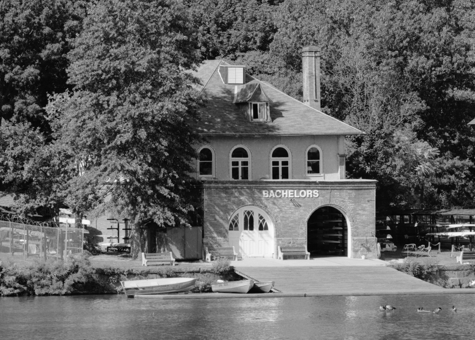
Bachelors Barge Club,
#6 Kelly Drive (1894)

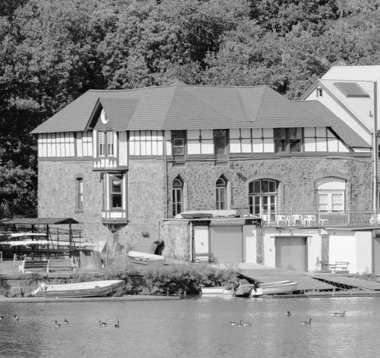
Crescent Boat Club,
#5 Kelly Drive (1871)

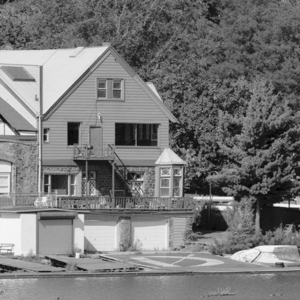
Pennsylvania Barge Club,
#4 Kelly Drive (1892)

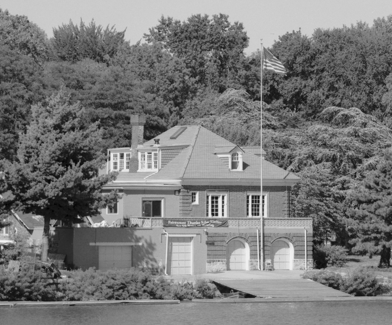
Fairmount Rowing Assoc.,
#2-3 Kelly Drive (1904)

=== Miscellaneous images ===
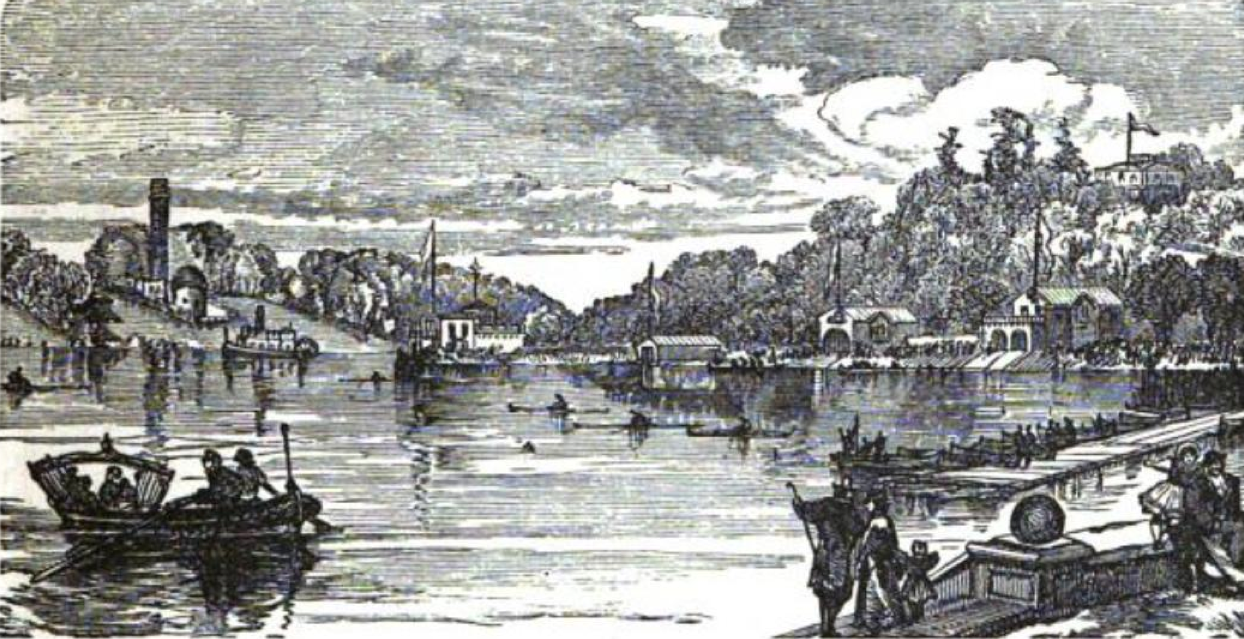
Artist's rendition of the Row (c. 1860-71)

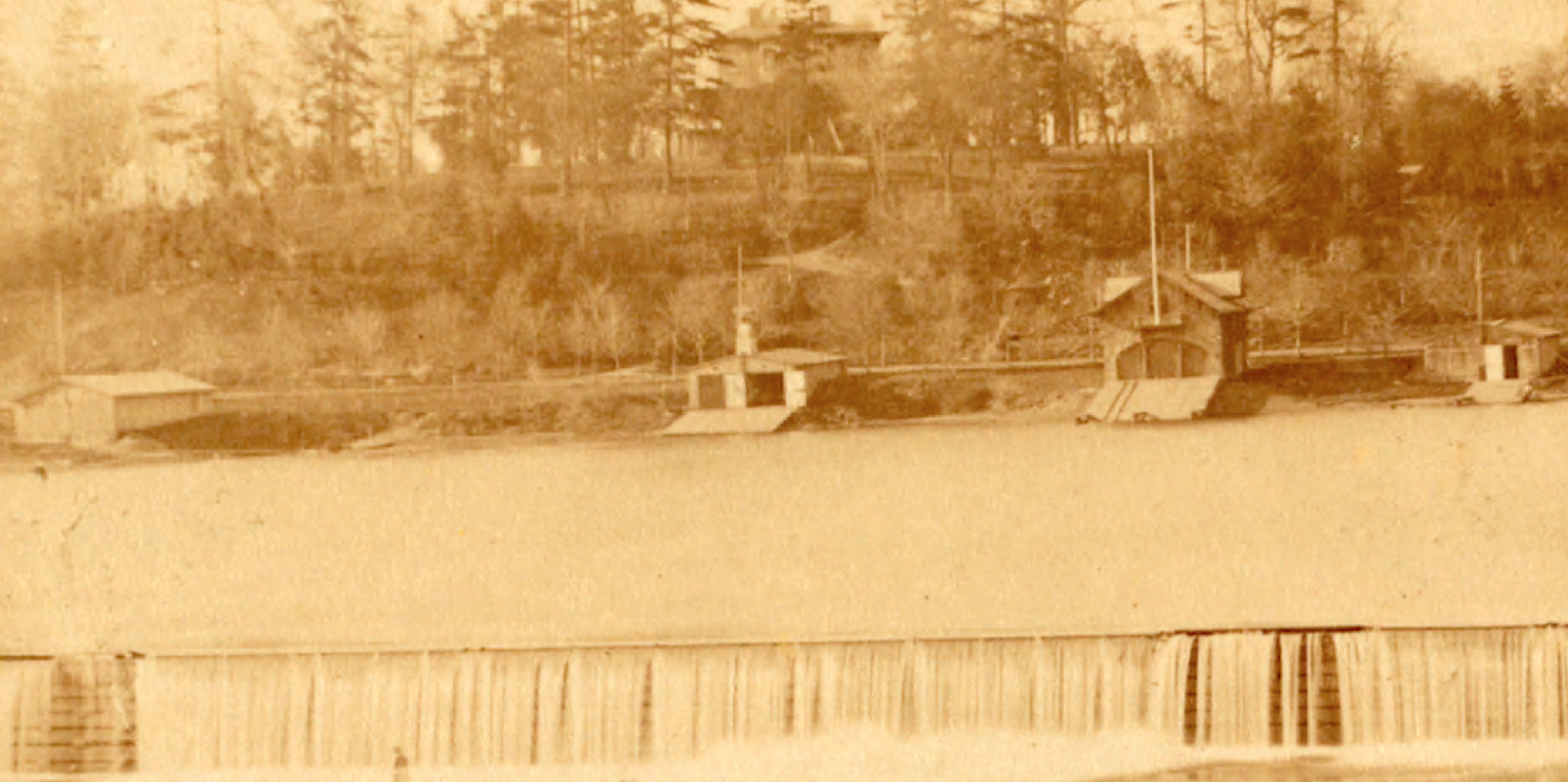
The Row with Lemon Hill in background (c. 1860-71)

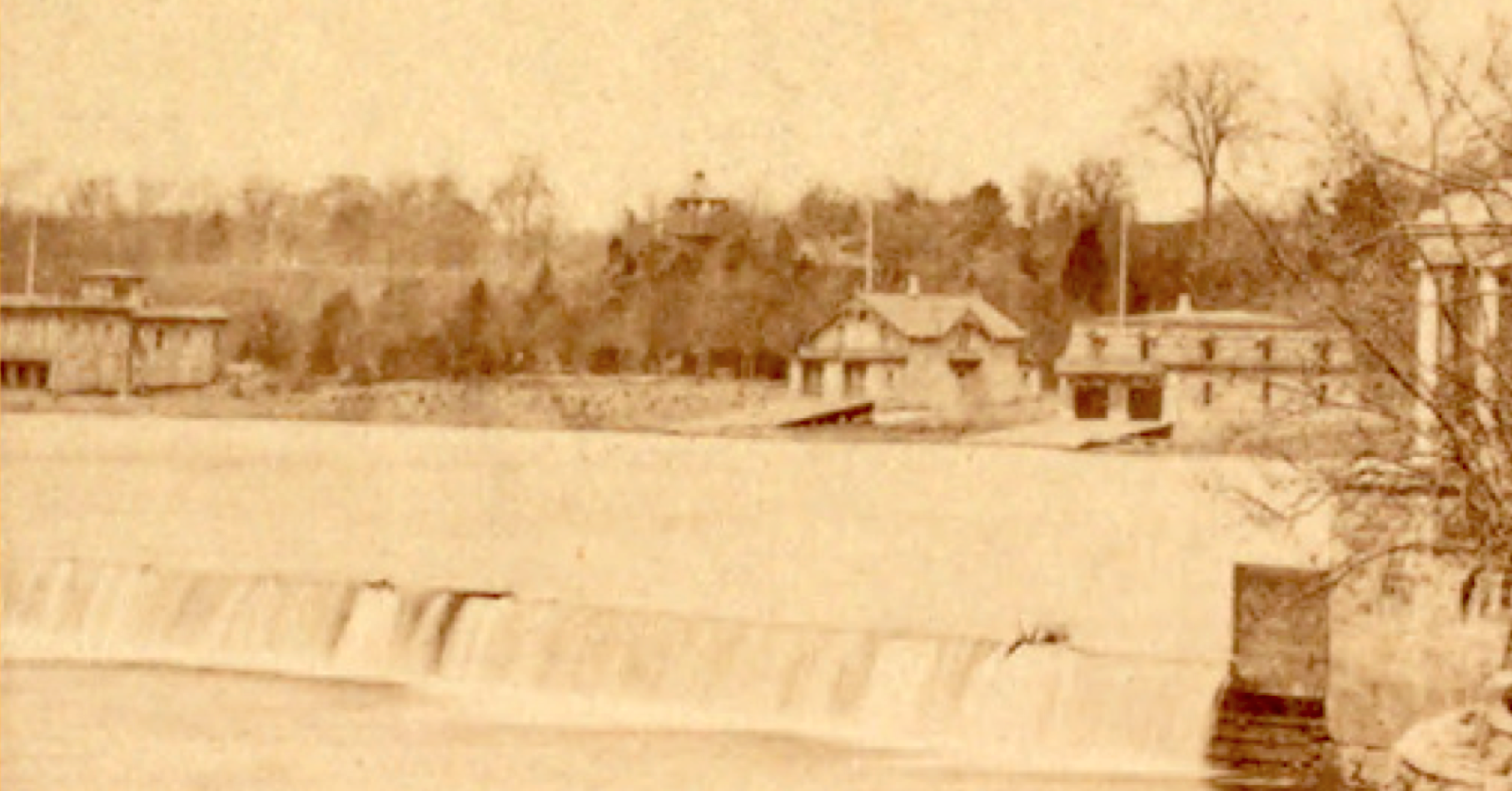
Boathouse Row (c. 1873-74), from left to right: #14; #9–10; and #7-8 after one-story structures were removed

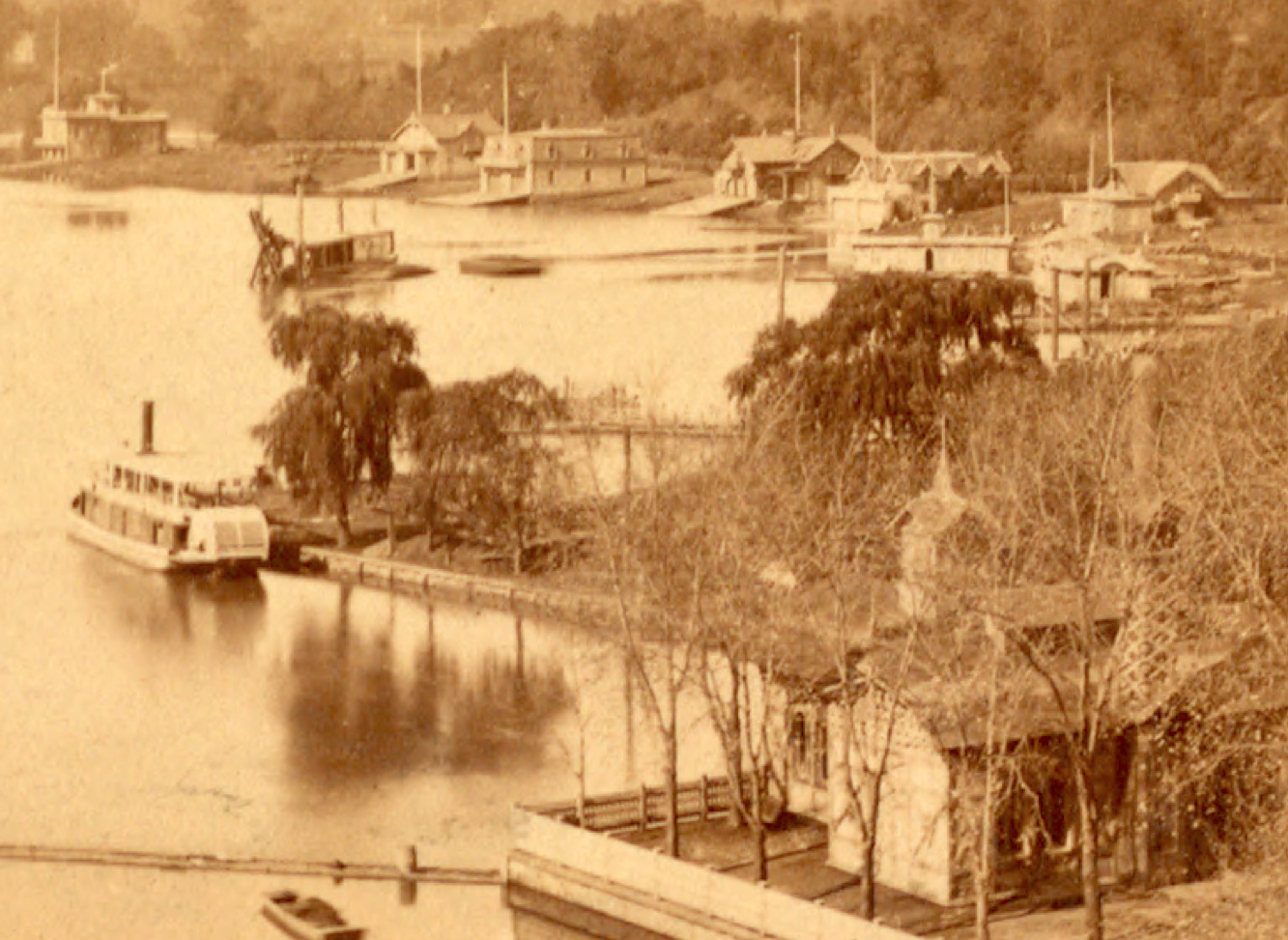
Boathouse Row from the Water Works (c. 1873-74)

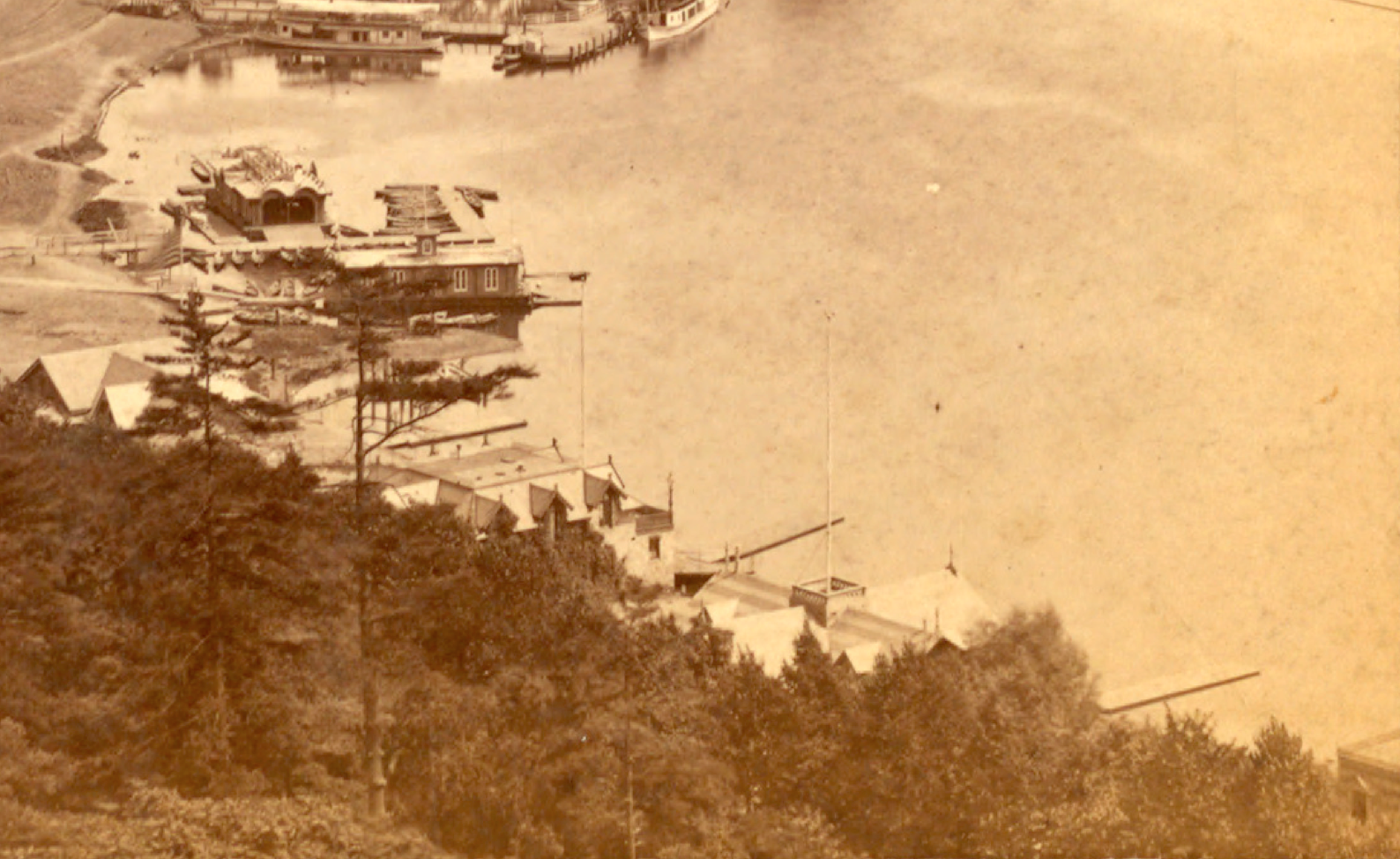
Boathouse Row from Lemon Hill (c. 1873-74)

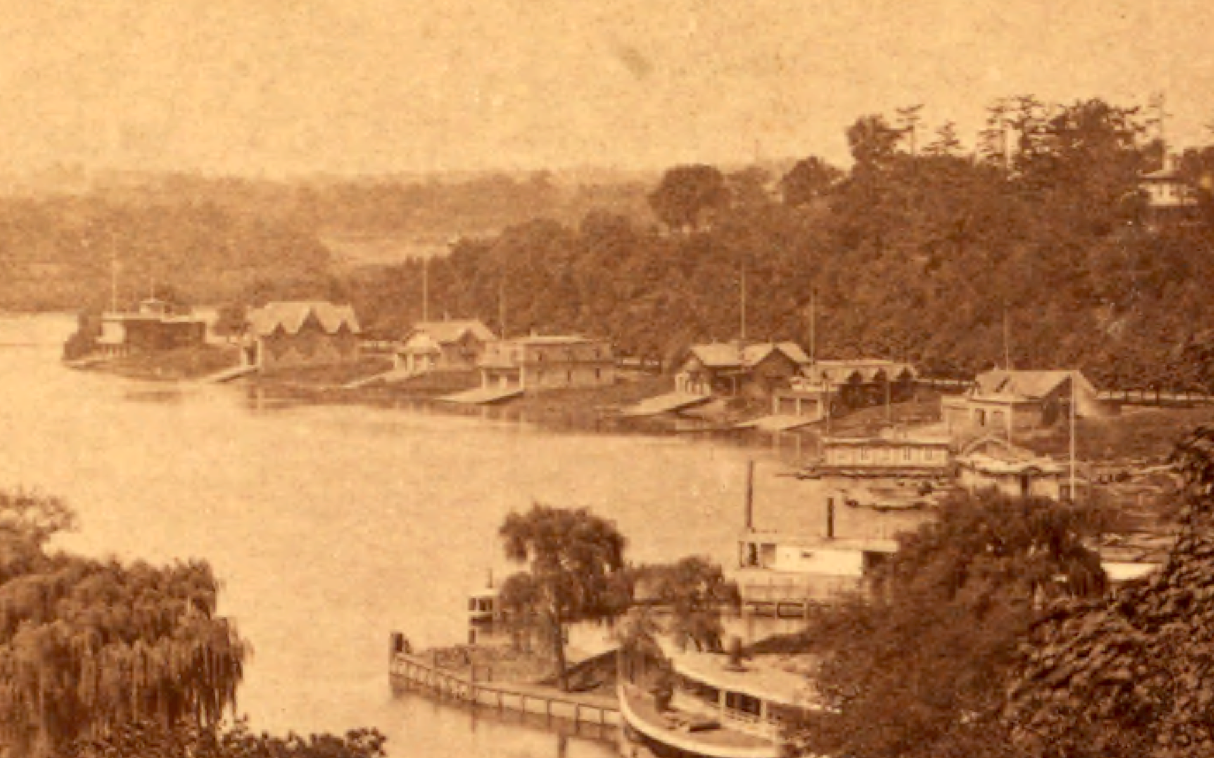
Boathouse Row (c. 1874-77), from left to right: #14; #11; #9–10; #7-8, #6; #4–5; and #2-3 just after #11 was built and before #12

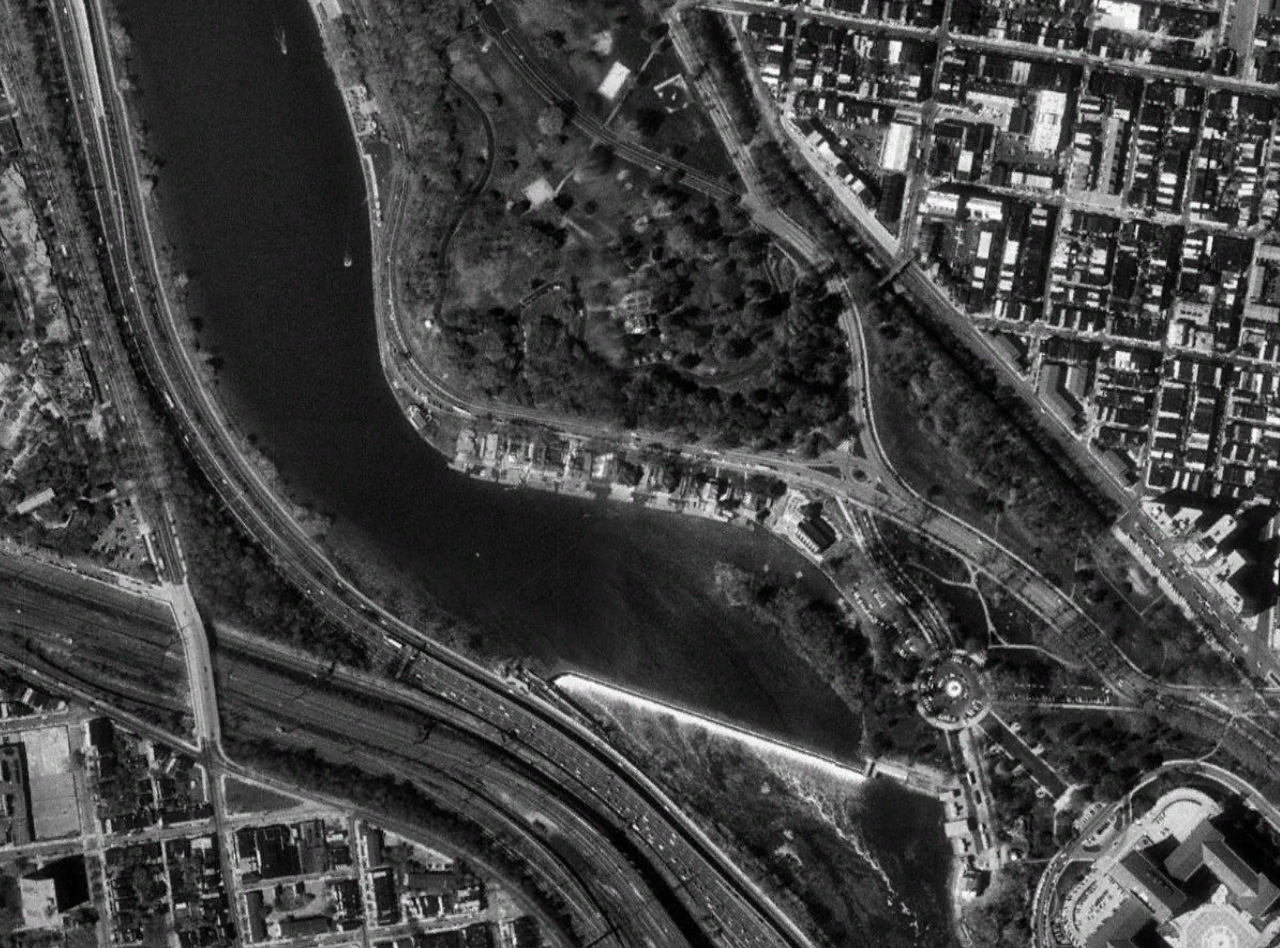
Declassified KH-11 spy satellite image of the Row

== See also ==
- List of National Historic Landmarks in Philadelphia
- National Register of Historic Places in North Philadelphia
