= Fairmount Rowing Association =

American rowing club

Coordinates: 39.96923°N 75.18593°W

- Location: #2 Boathouse Row, Philadelphia, Pennsylvania, U.S.A.
- Home water: Schuylkill River
- Established: 1877
- Navy admission: 1916
- Key people: Jake Reardon (President); Molly Konopka (Coach)
- Colors: Blue and White
- Affiliations: Episcopal Academy, Germantown Friends School
- Website: fairmountrowing.com
- Fairmount Rowing Association
- U.S. Historic district – Contributing property
- Philadelphia Register of Historic Places
- Location within Pennsylvania Location within the United States
- Location: Philadelphia, Pennsylvania, U.S.
- Part of: Boathouse Row (ID87000821)
- Added to NRHP: February 27, 1987

Fairmount Rowing Association is an amateur rowing club, founded in 1877. The facility, located at #2 Boathouse Row in the historic Boathouse Row of Philadelphia, Pennsylvania, is on the National Register of Historic Places. Fairmount originally catered to blue-collar youths living in the Fairmount neighborhood. In 1916, after decades of being rejected, the club was finally allowed to join the Schuylkill Navy. The Club boasts being known as the "premiere club for Masters rowing in the mid-Atlantic region" and has produced several world class rowers.

== History of the boathouse ==
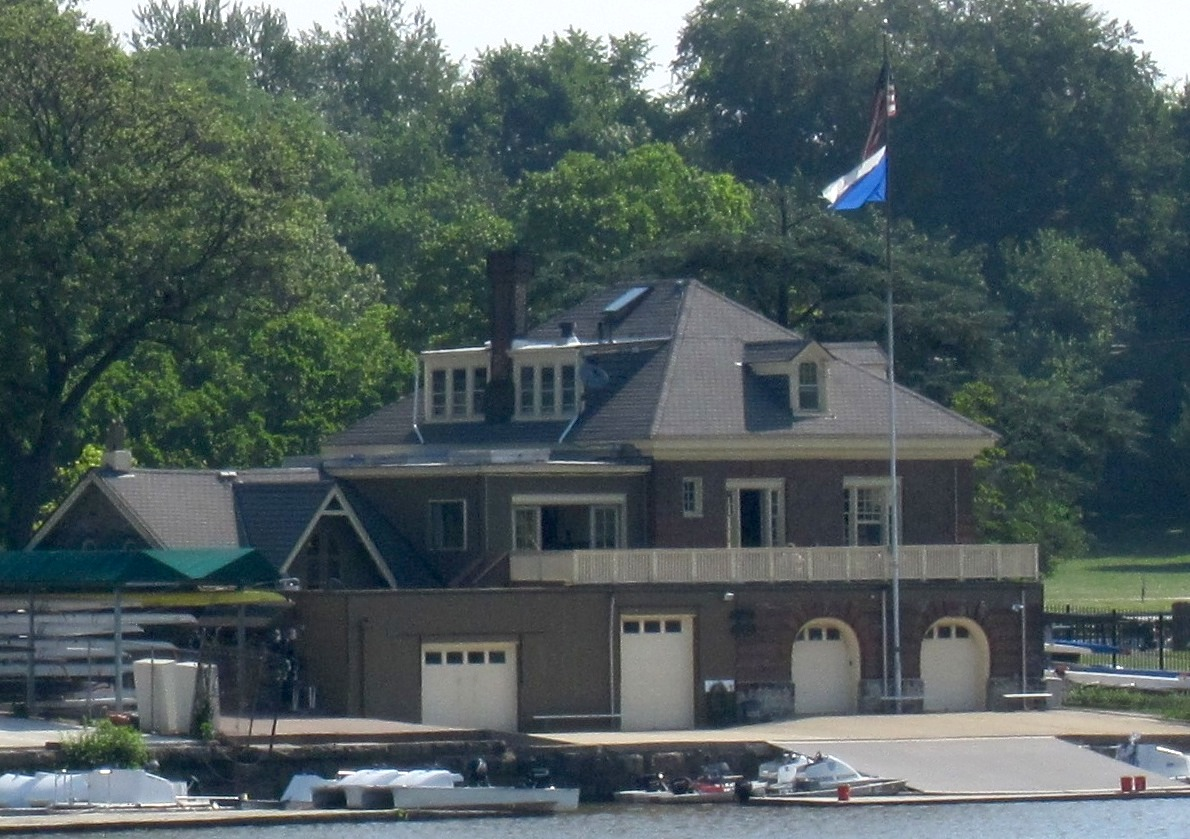
The two-story 1860 gothic structure at #3 on the left is now part of the 1904 three-story Georgian Revival structure on the right that replaced Pacific Barge Club's old #2.

The structure currently known as #2 Boathouse Row is a result of a 1945 expansion project that eliminated #3 Boathouse Row by merging it into Fairmount Rowing Association's building at #2 Boathouse Row.

=== Pacific Barge Club ===
Pacific Barge Club was founded in 1859, but was not a member of the Schuylkill Navy. In 1860, Pacific Barge Club built a stone cottage-style boathouse at the site of #2 Boathouse row. Half of the building was occupied by the Pacific Barge Club while the other half was rented to the Philadelphia Boat Club. In 1881, the Fairmount Rowing Association purchased #2 Boathouse Row and Pacific Barge Club's equipment.

In 1904, Fairmount Rowing demolished the stone building built by Pacific Barge Club. Walter Smedley, a founder of the T-Square Club, designed the Georgian Revival style Flemish bond brick structure that replaced the 1860 stone boathouse and now occupies the southern half of the Fairmount Rowing's boathouse. Smedley, specialized in colonial revival residences, and also designed the Northern National Bank and the West Philadelphia Title and Trust Company.

=== Camilla Boat Club and Quaker City Barge Club ===
Camilla Boat Club was a founding member of the Schuylkill Navy. Camilla was a champion of the Schuylkill, but the Club disband as a result of disagreements between members. In 1858, the remnants of the defunct Camilla Boat Club reorganized to form Quaker City Barge Club.

By 1866, Quaker City Barge Club had purchased #3 Boathouse Row from the Pacific Barge Club. Among various rowing accomplishment, Quaker City raced the first four oared boat with coxswain. The Quaker City Barge Club began to decline in the 1880s and never raced in the Schuylkill Navy Regatta after 1926. In 1932, the Quaker City Barge Club declared itself “inactive” in the Schuylkill Navy and became completely defunct in the 1940s. In 1945, under the leadership of John Carlin, Fairmount Rowing Association bought Quaker City Barge Club's equipment and absorbed its boathouse, which now serves as the northern half of Fairmount Rowing's boathouse.

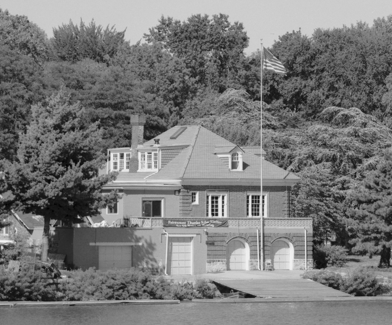
Fairmount Rowing Association,
#2 Boathouse Row.
