= University Barge Club =

American rowing club

Coordinates: 39.96937°N 75.18739°W

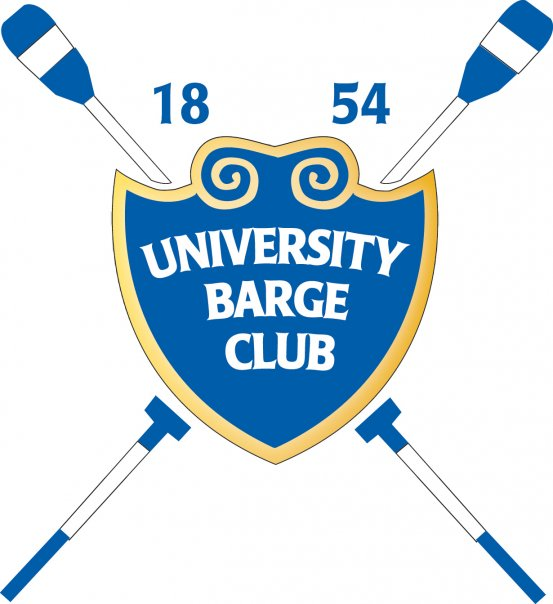

- Location: #7 Boathouse Row, Philadelphia, Pennsylvania, U.S.
- Home water: Schuylkill River
- Established: 1851
- Navy admission: 1854 (founding member)
- Key people: Brendan O'Malley(president); Alex Cook (captain); Deirdre Mullen (Navy delegate); Jennifer Wesson (HOSR director)
- Membership: 250 active members
- Colors: Royal Blue and White
- Affiliations: Chestnut Hill Academy, Springside School, University of Pennsylvania Alumni Rowing, and Head of the Schuylkill
- Website: http://www.universitybarge.com

Philadelphia Register of Historic Places

University Barge Club of Philadelphia (also known as UBC) is an amateur rowing club located at #7 in the historic Boathouse Row of Philadelphia, Pennsylvania. It is listed on the National Register of Historic Places and designated a National Historic Landmark. The club's founding, in 1854, is considered the "dawn of organized athletics in the University of Pennsylvania." Known as "the upper-class rowing club," UBC is a founder, and the most senior member, of the oldest amateur athletic governing body in the United States, the Schuylkill Navy.

== Founding ==
University Barge Club was founded in 1854 by ten members of the University of Pennsylvania's freshman class: They first rowed out of a Schuylkill boathouse near the Fairmount Waterworks known simply as "Charlie's boathouse". The club was officially formed when the founders purchased its first boat, the Hesperus, from Bachelors Barge Club. Club members wore sailor uniforms from clothier Jacob Reed that were monogrammed with "U.B.C." on their hats and belts. In 1855, members of the club, in conjunction with the Philadelphia Barge Club, built a one-story brick boathouse on rented land. The club purchased a second boat, named Lucifer. After 1860, both boats were moved to a space rented from the Philadelphia Skating Club, which is now the Philadelphia Girls' Rowing Club.

At first, membership was limited to students enrolled at Penn, but the club was not listed as a student organization of the university until 1867, when the University Barge Club won the Schuylkill Navy championship flag. Membership was later opened to Penn alumni and certain non-alumni.

Although the club was still affiliated with the university, it gradually began to cater more to non-students. As the club's membership became dominated by Old Philadelphians from the upper-class aristocracy, student enthusiasm waned.

In 1871, the Fairmount Park commission allowed the club to build its own boathouse on Boathouse Row. In 1872, Penn students formed an alternative club, the College Boat Club, to cater to students and focus on preparing for intercollegiate competitions.

In 1887, University Barge Club leased an additional upriver clubhouse for social functions called The Lilacs on the west bank of the Schuylkill. Today, while many of the University Barge Club's members are University of Pennsylvania graduates, the club has no official affiliation with the university.

University Barge Club is the sister club of Union Boat Club of Boston. For more than 60 years, the two sister clubs have held an annual interclub "UBC" regatta.

== History of the boathouse ==
The boathouse, at #7-8 Boathouse Row, dates from 1871, and was greatly expanded in 1891. Originally, University Barge Club only occupied #7, while Philadelphia Barge Club occupied #8. In 1932, University Barge Club acquired #8 when Philadelphia Barge Club ceased operations.

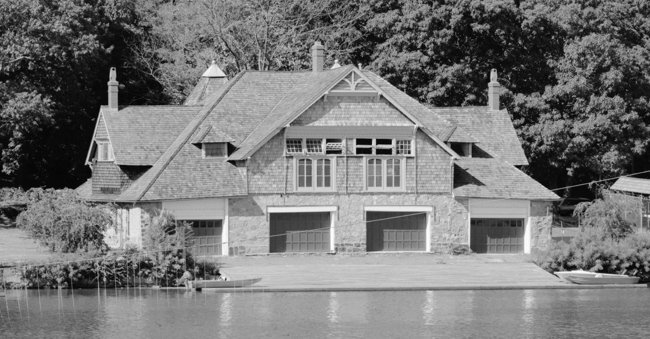
University Barge Club,
#7-8 Boathouse Row

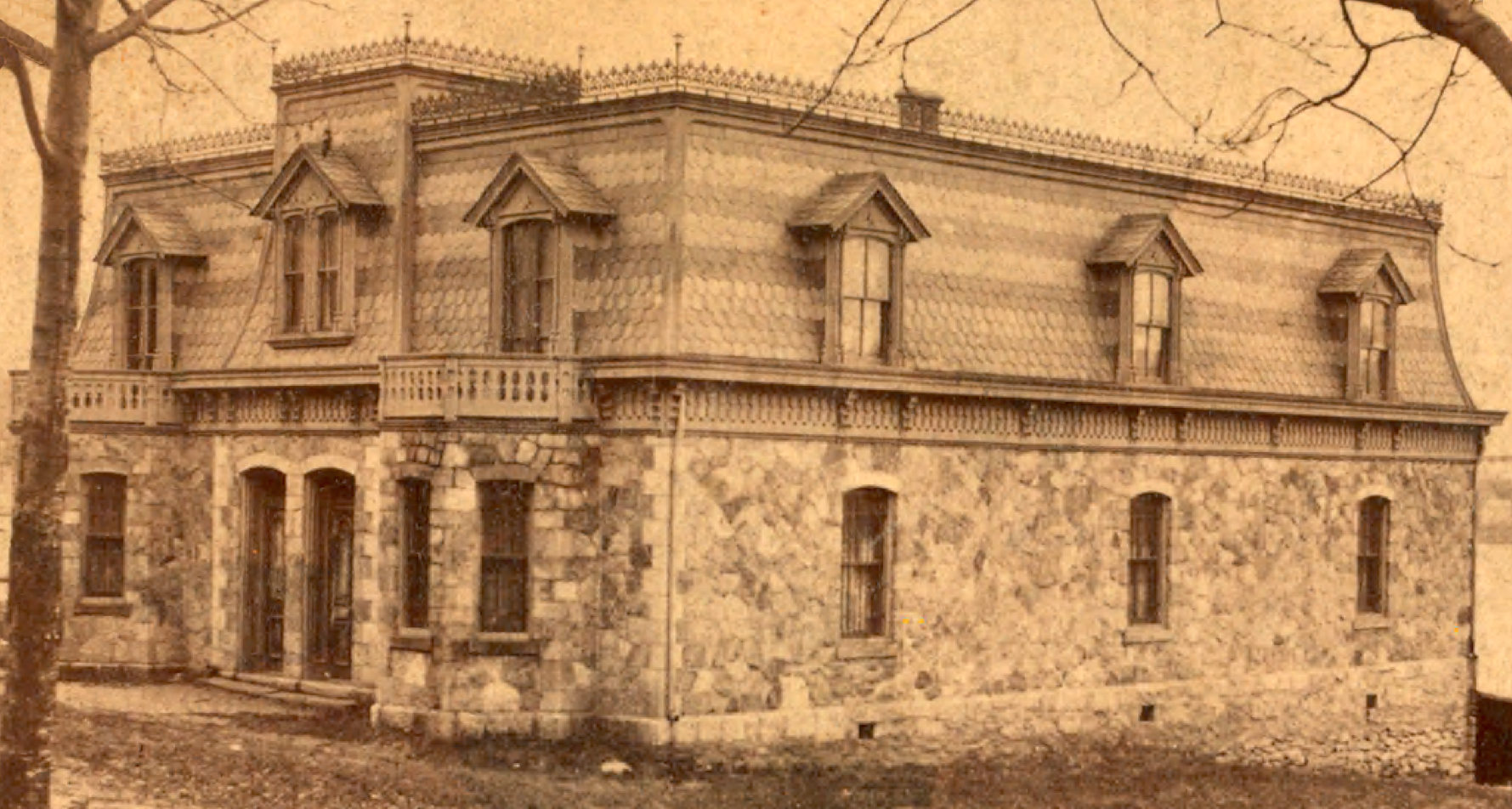
Boathouse before 1891 expansion
