= Bachelors Barge Club =

American rowing club

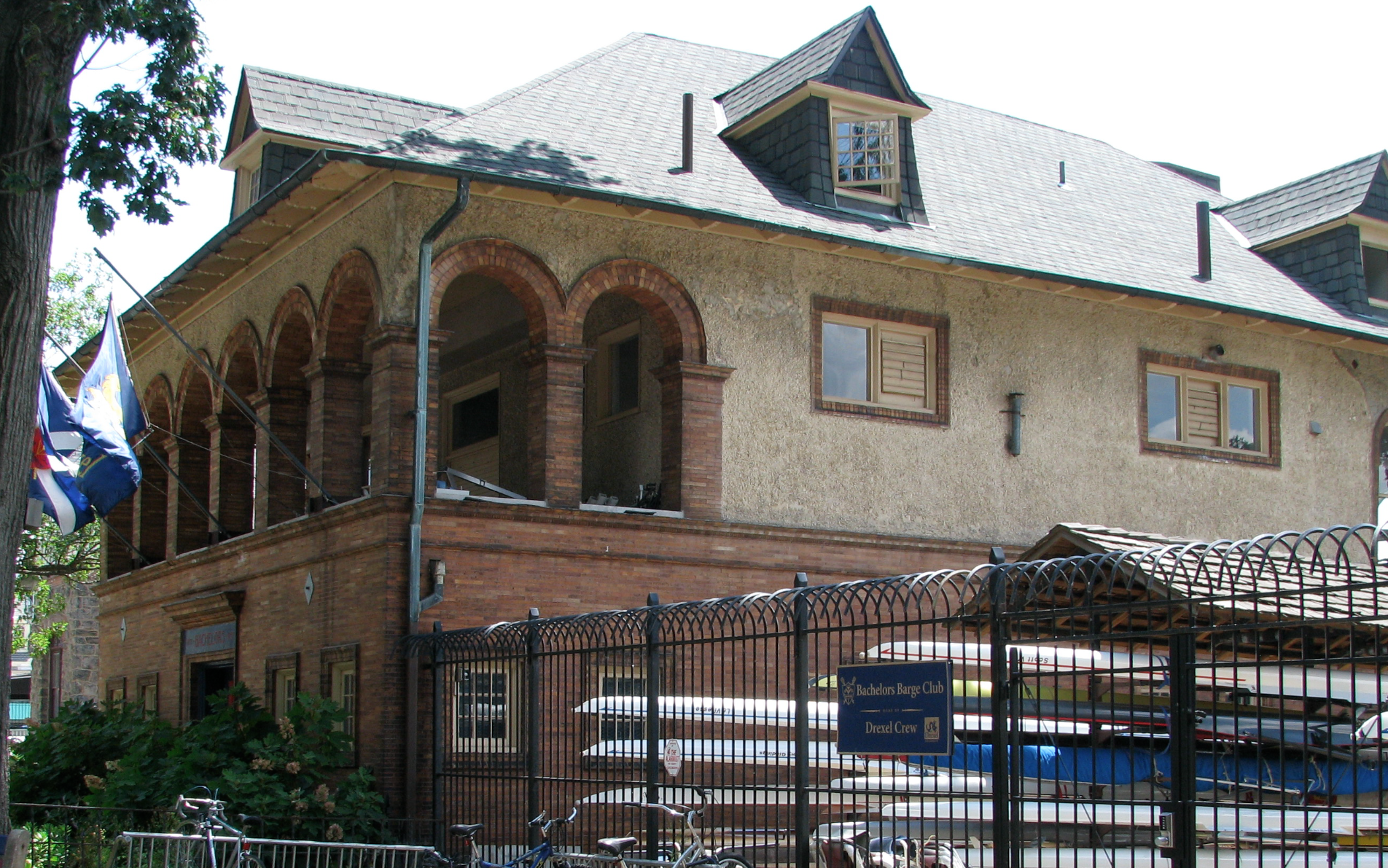
- Location: #6 Boathouse Row, Philadelphia, Pennsylvania, U.S.
- Home water: Schuylkill River
- Established: 1853
- Navy admission: 1859 (reinstated 1882)
- Key people: James A. Meadowcroft (President); Henry Hauptfuhrer (Captain); John Rice (Treasurer); Margaret Gordon (Coach)
- Membership: 150
- Colors: Navy and Red
- Affiliations: Conestoga High School and Drexel University
- Website: bachelorsbargeclub.org
- Bachelors Barge Club
- U.S. Historic district – Contributing property
- Philadelphia Register of Historic Places
- Location within Pennsylvania Location within the United States
- Location: Philadelphia, Pennsylvania, U.S.
- Coordinates: 39.96978°N 75.18527°W
- Part of: Boathouse Row (ID87000821)
- Added to NRHP: February 27, 1987

Bachelors Barge Club is an amateur rowing club located at #6 Boathouse Row in the historic Boathouse Row of Philadelphia, Pennsylvania. It is the oldest continuously operating boathouse in the United States. It went through renovations as part of the "Light Boathouse Row" initiative, in which new LED lights were fitted to each of the boathouses. Bachelors Barge Club is currently home to several programs, including the Conestoga High School Crew Team, and the Drexel University Crew Team, among several others.

== Founding ==
The founding fathers of Bachelors Barge Club were members of the Phoenix Engine Company, a volunteer fire-fighting organization. Initially, membership was limited to bachelors, however the Club opened its doors to married men shortly after its founding. Membership at the club has risen considerably since the early 1980s when the Club counted only 10 members. Now, the majority of Bachelors Barge Club's 150 members are women.

Israel W. Morris, a prominent iron merchant and philanthropist, is credited with founding the club. He was also elected as its second president. Other prominent Philadelphian 19th century industrialist members include Charles F. Berwind (coal), William Weightman (chemicals), Maxwell Wyeth (pharmaceuticals), Charles E. Mather (insurance), W. Atlee Burpee (seeds and plants), Clarkson Clothier (retailing) and J. B. Lippincott (publishing).

William Gilmore and other members of Bachelors Barge Club won Olympic medals for the single and the four in 1924, the single in 1928, and the double in the 1932.

In 1995, Barb Spitz and Izzie (Gordon) Brown won the silver medal in the Woman's lightweight Double event at the Pan AM Games in Argentina. Also in 1995, the team, coached by Harold Finigan, won the Point Trophy at the Canadian Henley Regatta—winning every sculling event in the Intermediate and Senior Women's categories. The next year, the athletes went on to win gold at the World Championships in Strathclyde. In 1996, Ty Bennin and Andy McMarlin won US Olympic Team Trials in the Men's 2x. Coached by Harold FInigan In 1999, the club fielded a girls junior quad that qualified to row at the Junior WOrld Championships in Plovdid, Bulgaria.

Cody Lowry was named to the 2009 US National Team to row in the Lightweight Men's Single Sculls.

== The Boathouse ==
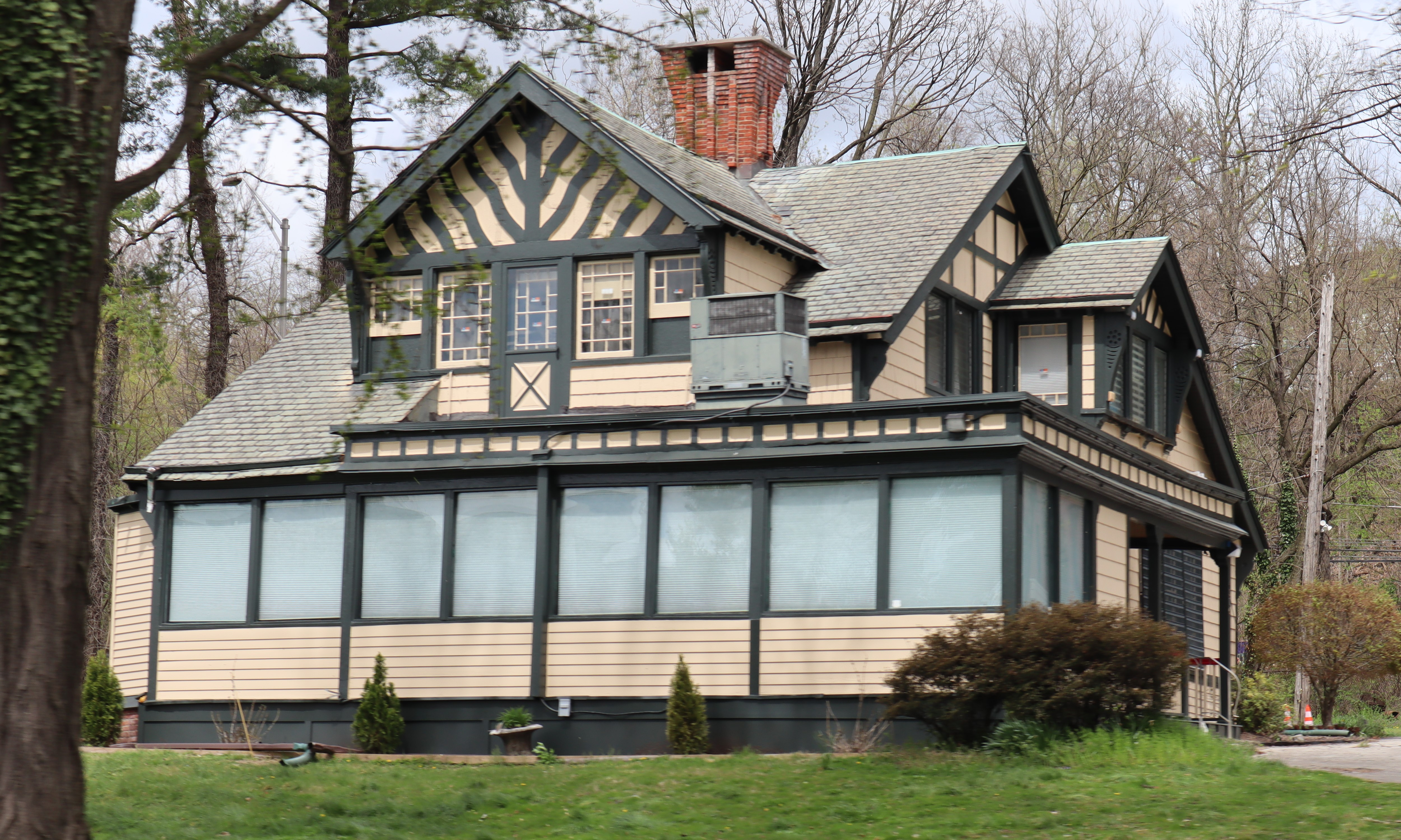
The Bachelor's Button in 2024

Bachelors Barge Club occupied several boathouses in succession before 1860, when it built a stone building. In 1884, architects Edward Hazelhurst and Samuel Huckel, Jr. designed the club's social up-river house in East Falls, the Bachelor's Button. The two architects had teamed up in 1881, and maintained a 20-year partnership that produced residential and ecclesiastical architecture including the Union Methodist Church and the Mother Bethel A.M.E. Church.

In 1893, the Fairmount Park Commission allowed the club to replace its 1860 building. In 1894, construction was finished on the Mediterranean-style boathouse at #6 Boathouse Row, which was also designed by the Harlehurst and Huckel team. Huckel became a member of Bachelors after designing its boathouse. Today, the building remains relatively unchanged.

== Wharton Crew ==
The several organizations that row out of Bachelors include the Wharton Crew Team, which is the rowing team for Wharton Business School at the University of Pennsylvania. All other University of Pennsylvania crews row out of College Boat Club. Wharton Crew is one of the largest graduate and professional student athletic clubs at Penn. The program owns two Vespoli eight shells –– the Wharton Journal and the Russell Palmer. In 1997, team member and co-captain, John Hall, broke the world record in the master's lightweight 2000 meter ergometer.
