= Undine Barge Club =

Amateur rowing club in Philadelphia, Pennsylvania, U.S.

Coordinates: 39.96967°N 75.18894°W

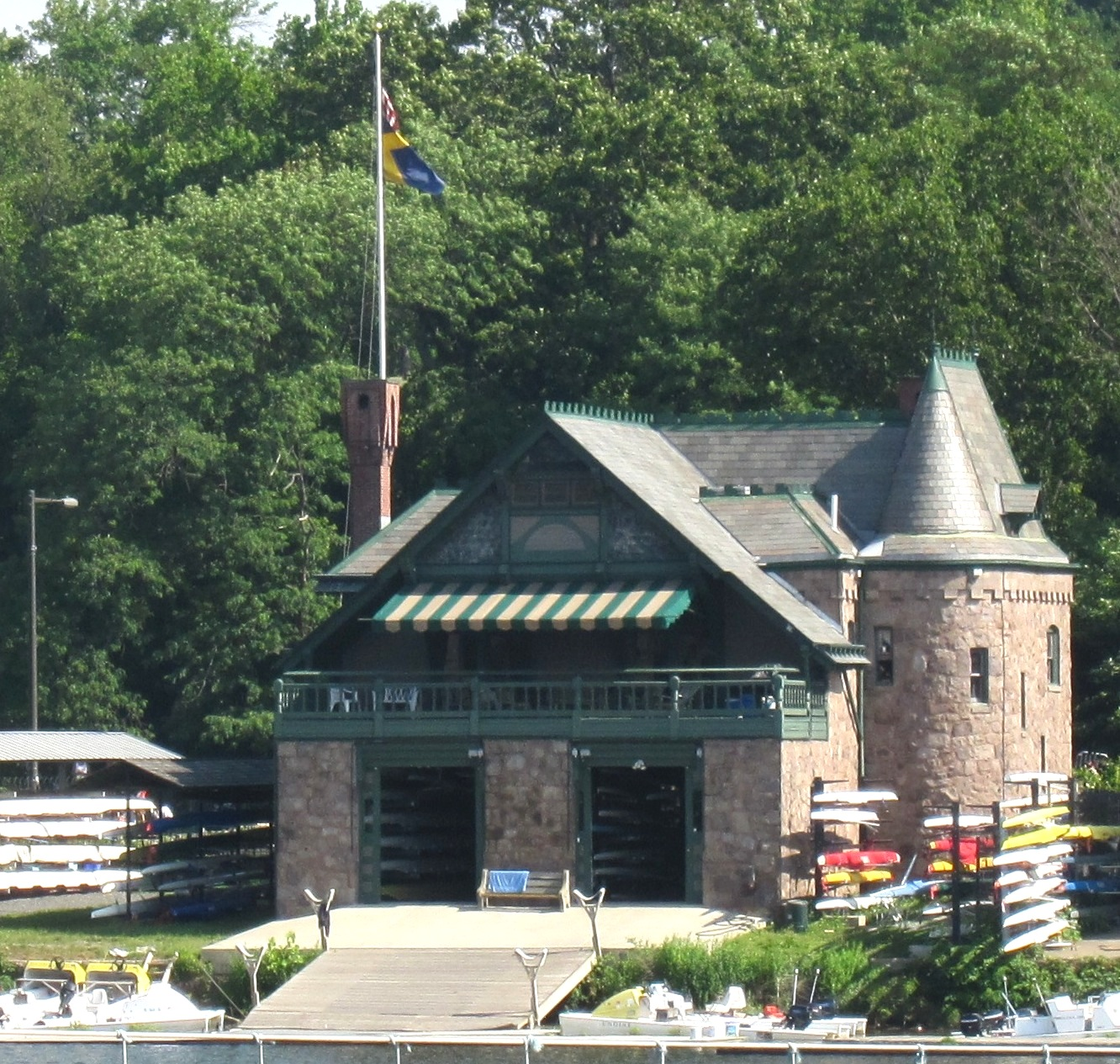
- Motto: Labor ipse voluptas
- Motto in English: Labor itself is a pleasure
- Location: #13 Boathouse Row, Philadelphia, Pennsylvania, U.S.
- Home water: Schuylkill River
- Established: 1856
- Navy admission: 1858 (founding member)
- Key people: John Leonard (President); Michael Naughton (Vice President); George Schaefer (Captain); Christopher McElroy (Navy delegate)
- Membership: 300
- Colors: Yellow Blue and White
- Affiliations: The Baldwin School and William Penn Charter School
- Website: undine.com
- Undine Barge Club
- U.S. Historic district – Contributing property
- Philadelphia Register of Historic Places
- Location within Pennsylvania Location within the United States
- Location: Philadelphia, Pennsylvania
- Part of: Boathouse Row (ID87000821)
- Added to NRHP: February 27, 1987

Undine Barge Club is an amateur rowing club located at #13 Boathouse Row in the historic Boathouse Row along the Schuylkill River in Philadelphia, Pennsylvania. The club was founded in 1856. Undine was not initially listed as a founder of the Schuylkill Navy, but is now considered a founder because an Undine member, Mr. B. F. Van dyke, was elected to represent the club as secretary treasurer of the Navy from its birth in 1858. In 1860, Undine purchased Keystone Barge Club's (the 1st) boat and equipment, as Keystone had disposed of its boathouse.

The club's name is derived from the Legend of Undine, and the club has an upriver house for social functions named Castle Ringstetten, which is the name of the castle in the legend. The boathouse and Castle Ringstetten were designed by renowned Victorian-era architect Frank Furness and exemplify his original ideas that laid the foundation for modern architecture.

== Prominent members ==
- Jen Klapper - 2009 US National Team member (Adaptive Mixed Four)
- Mike Naughton 2009 US National Team Coaching Staff
- Meghan Sarbanis - 2009 US National Team member (Lightweight Women's Single Sculls) 2003 US National Team member (Lightweight Women's Pair)
- Joe Quaid - 2007 US National Team Coaching Staff
- Sam Saylor - 2006 National Team member, 2007 US National Team member (Men's Lightweight Quadruple Sculls)
- Jon D’Alba - 2006 National Team member, 2007 US National Team member (Men's Lightweight Quadruple Sculls)
- Cody Lowry - 2006 National Team member, 2007 US National Team member (Men's Lightweight Quadruple Sculls)
- Dan Urevick-Ackelsberg - 2006 National Team member, 2007 US National Team member (Men's Lightweight Quadruple Sculls), 2010 National Team member
- Andrew Quinn - 2009 US National Team member (Men's Lightweight Double Sculls) 2008 US National Team member (Men's Lightweight Quadruple Scull)
- Tim Young - 1996 Olympic Team member, Silver Medalist
- Michael Senf - 2015, Under 23 National Team member (Men's Lightweight Quadruple Sculls)
- Reid Cucci - 2015, 2016 Under 23 National Team member (Men's Lightweight Quadruple Sculls)

== Photo gallery ==
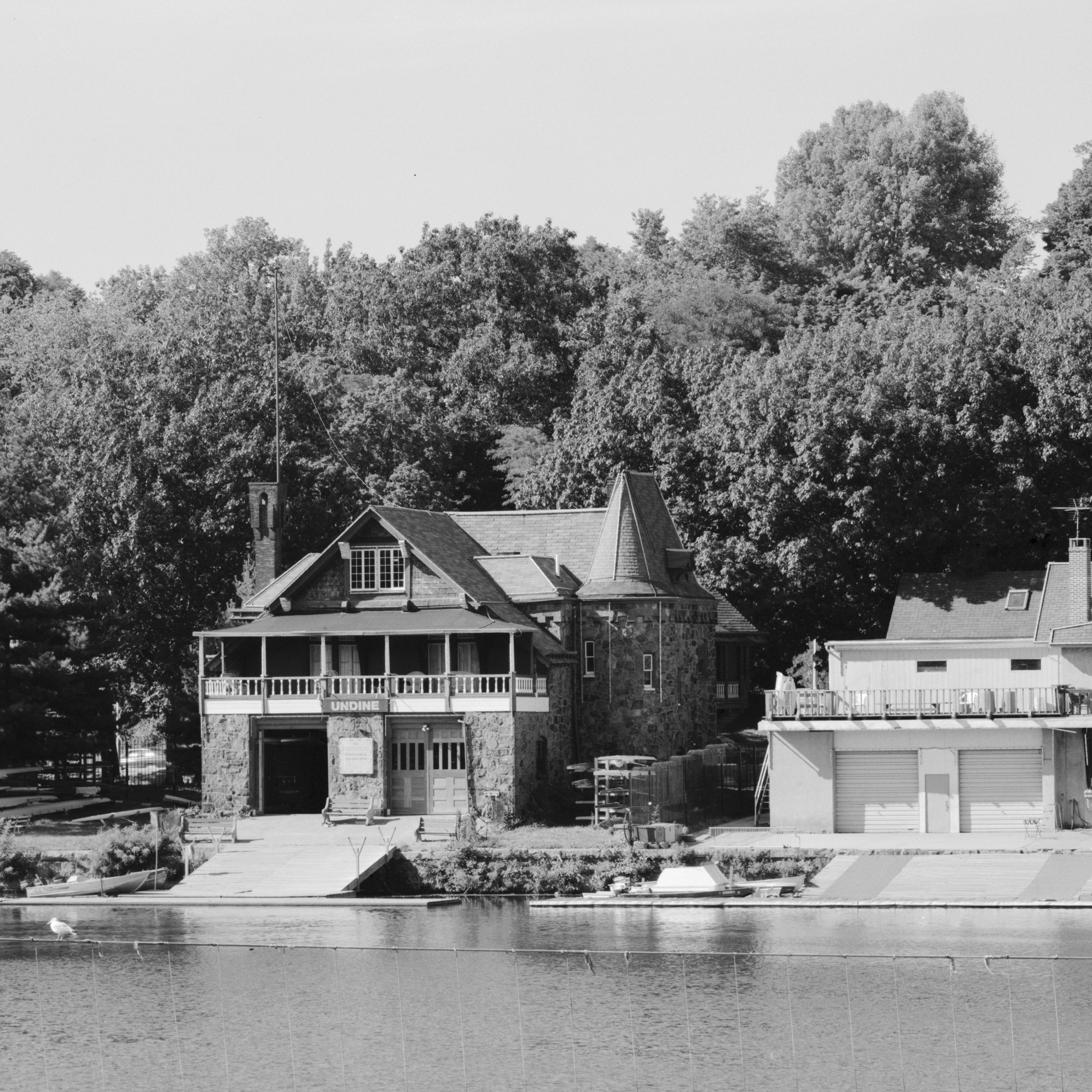
13 Boathouse Row in 1972.
