= Philadelphia Skating Club and Humane Society =

Figure skating club in Ardmore, Pennsylvania

Coordinates: 40.008182°N 75.301221°W

- Formation: 1849/1861
- Location: 220 Holland Avenue, Ardmore PA 19003-1292 USA
- President: Laura Mitchell
- Skating Director: Regina Woodward Barr
- Website: www.pschs.org

The Philadelphia Skating Club and Humane Society is the oldest figure skating club in the United States.

== History ==
The predecessor organization, called "The Skater's Club of the City and County of Philadelphia", was founded in 1849, and merged with the assets of the Humane Society of Philadelphia in 1861. The latter organization was patterned after the Royal Humane Society; the original purpose of the club was to patrol outdoor skating areas around the city of Philadelphia, such as the Schuylkill River, in order to rescue skaters who had fallen through the ice. Club regulations still require members to carry a reel of stout twine for lifesaving purposes while skating outdoors.

In 1921, the Philadelphia Skating Club and Humane Society was one of the seven original clubs which formed the United States Figure Skating Association. It is one of the few clubs in the United States that owns its own rink, located in Ardmore, Pennsylvania, which opened in 1938.

Today, the Philadelphia Skating Club and Humane Society retains its traditions of both on and off-ice social events and activities while offering year-round recreational and competitive figure skating.

Notable skaters who have represented the club over the years include Dick Button, Scott Hamilton, and ice dance partners Kimberly Navarro and Brent Bommentre.

== Competitions ==
PSC&HS hosts two annual competitions. Challenge Cup in September and Boots and Blades in April. Challenge Cup is a US Figure Skating National Qualifying Series event first held in 1982. It includes singles and ice dance events from No Test to Senior levels. Boots and Blades is a non-qualifying competition for skaters at the Snowplow Sam to Preliminary test levels; it also includes solo dance and showcase events. The club periodically hosts the Philadelphia Areas Figure Skating Championships (commonly known as "All-Areas") on behalf of The Association of Philadelphia Area Figure Skating Clubs.

The US Figure Skating Eastern Adult Sectional championships were held at PSC&HS in March 2020.

== Synchronized skating teams ==
PSC&HS has several adult and junior synchronized skating teams that compete as Philly Spirit. The three junior teams are known as the Philly Spirit Starlets.
