= ZLAC Rowing Club =

Historic women's rowing club

Coordinates: 32°47′30.876″N 117°14′52.494″W

ZLAC Rowing Club is a women's rowing organization in San Diego, California, founded in 1892 by four young women: Zulette Lamb and sisters Lena, Agnes, and Caroline Polhamus. They used the initials of their first names to form the acronym "ZLAC".

The club operates from a waterfront location on Mission Bay in Pacific Beach. ZLAC has a special relationship with the San Diego Crew Classic, having helped to found the regatta in 1973.

== History ==
=== Early Years, 1892–1920 ===
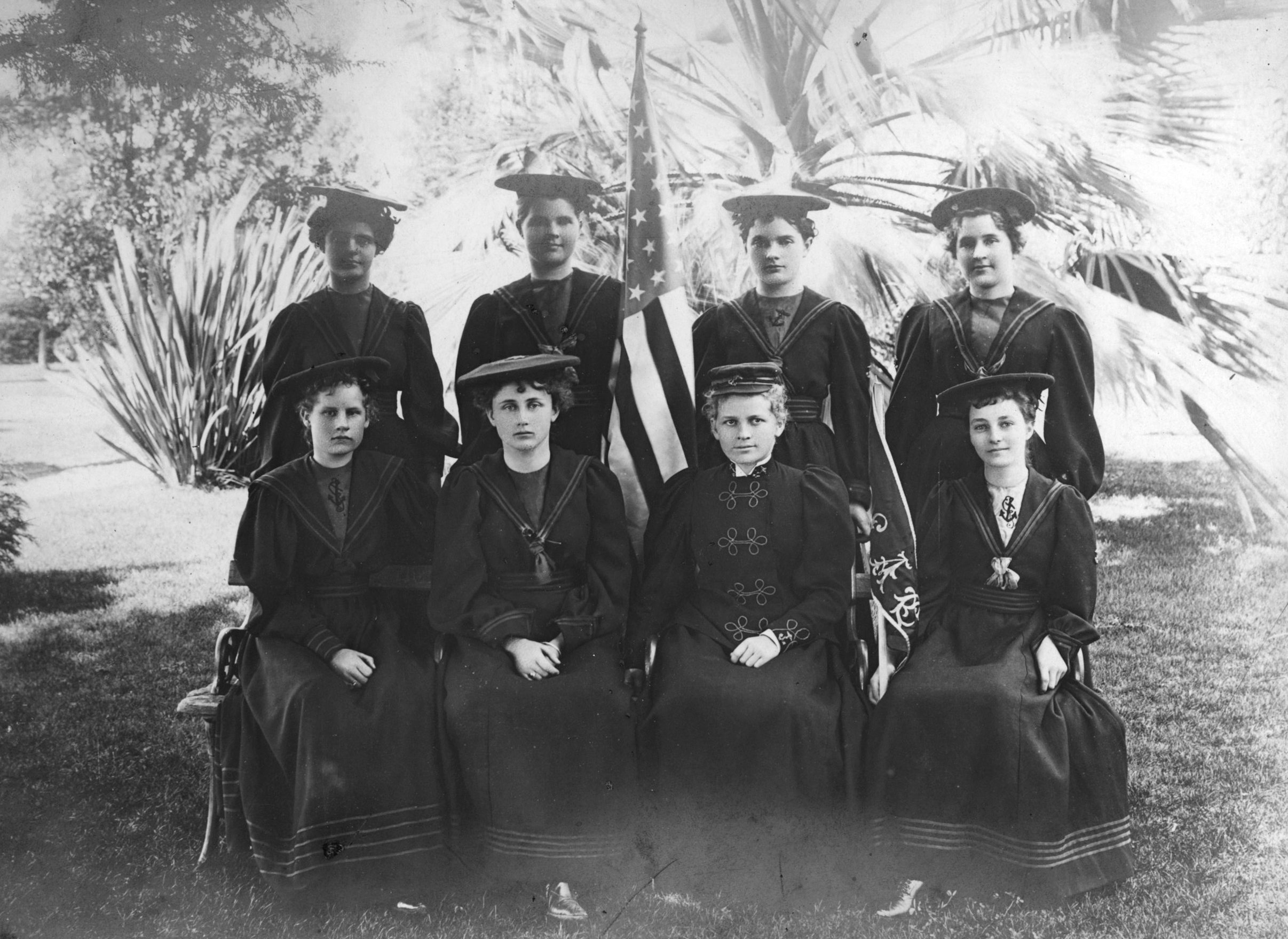
ZLAC Rowing Club, Crew I, c. 1900

ZLAC was founded in 1892 by four young women: three sisters named Lena Polhamus (1874–1957), Agnes Polhamus (1876–1962), Caroline Polhamus (1879–1950), together with their best friend Zulette Lamb (1877–1959). Taking the first letters of their names—Zulette, Lena, Agnes, and Caroline—they formed the acronym "ZLAC"

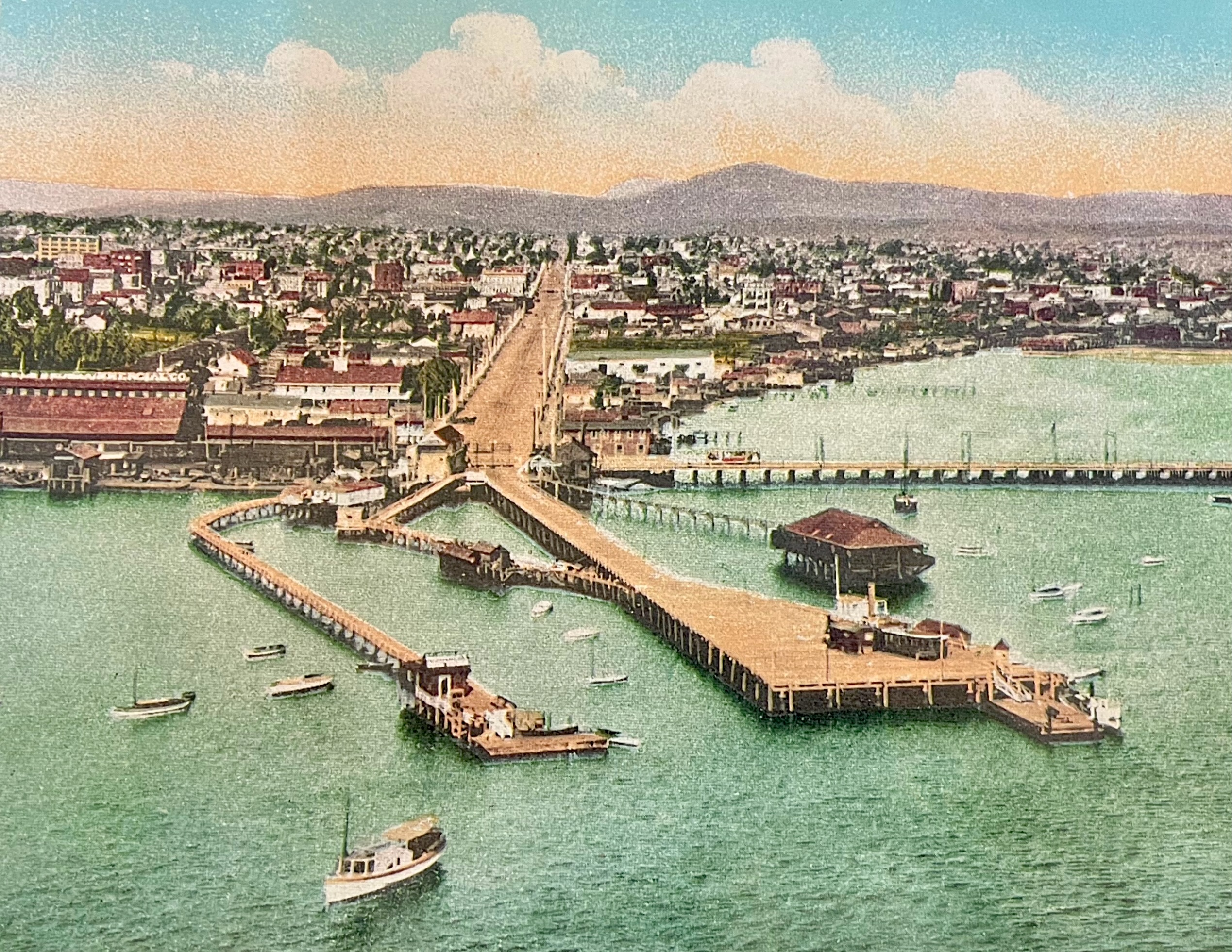
San Diego Bay, c. 1900, showing wharves at the foot of Market St.

At the time, San Diego was experiencing rapid transformation from a small town to a bustling harbor city, driven by the arrival of the Santa Fe Railway in 1885. The city had a population of around 16,000 and a thriving maritime economy. The Pacific Coast Steamship Company and other lines provided regular freight and passenger service between San Francisco and San Diego. Navy warships frequented San Diego Bay. In 1888, the San Diego Rowing Club, a men's organization, was established for recreational boating and swimming.

The Polhamus sisters learned to row from their father, Captain Albert A. Polhamus, port captain in San Diego and captain of the tug Santa Fe. When their small boat was damaged, they acquired a heavy, 4-oared butcher-boat that had been used to supply Navy ships. They recruited Zulette Lamb and started a club. Their goal was to row an eight-oared shell as the women of Wellesley College did.

ZLAC was founded at a time when women's athletics were beginning to gain acceptance. In the 1890s, many women's rowing clubs and college teams were established on both the East and West coasts to improve women's physical fitness and to compete in a sport made popular by men. San Diego, for example, had at least eight active women's rowing clubs in 1895. ZLAC is the only one that survives and continues to operate today.

In 1895, ZLAC raised enough money to buy their first eight-oared barge from Fred Carter, designer of the famous Herreschoff yachts. ZLAC I, now in the collection of the San Diego History Center, was an 8-oared wooden boat, 38-feet in length, with sliding seats. ZLAC rowers wore formal uniforms that consisted of black, ankle-length woolen skirts paired with matching middy blouses with distinctive yellow braid trim on the collar. The ensemble was completed with a yellow tie and a black tam o'shanter.

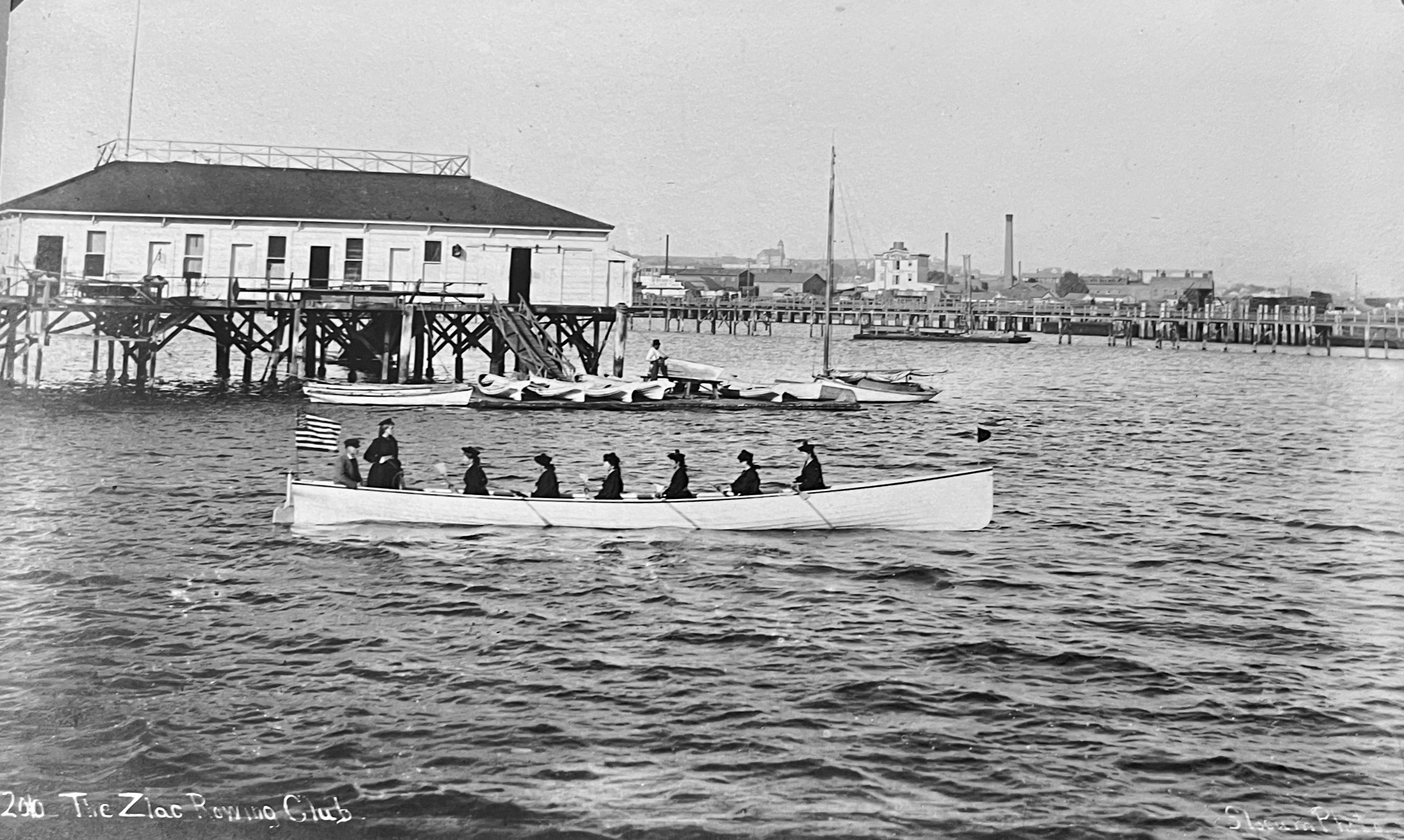
ZLAC Rowing Club, c. 1900, rowing on San Diego Bay

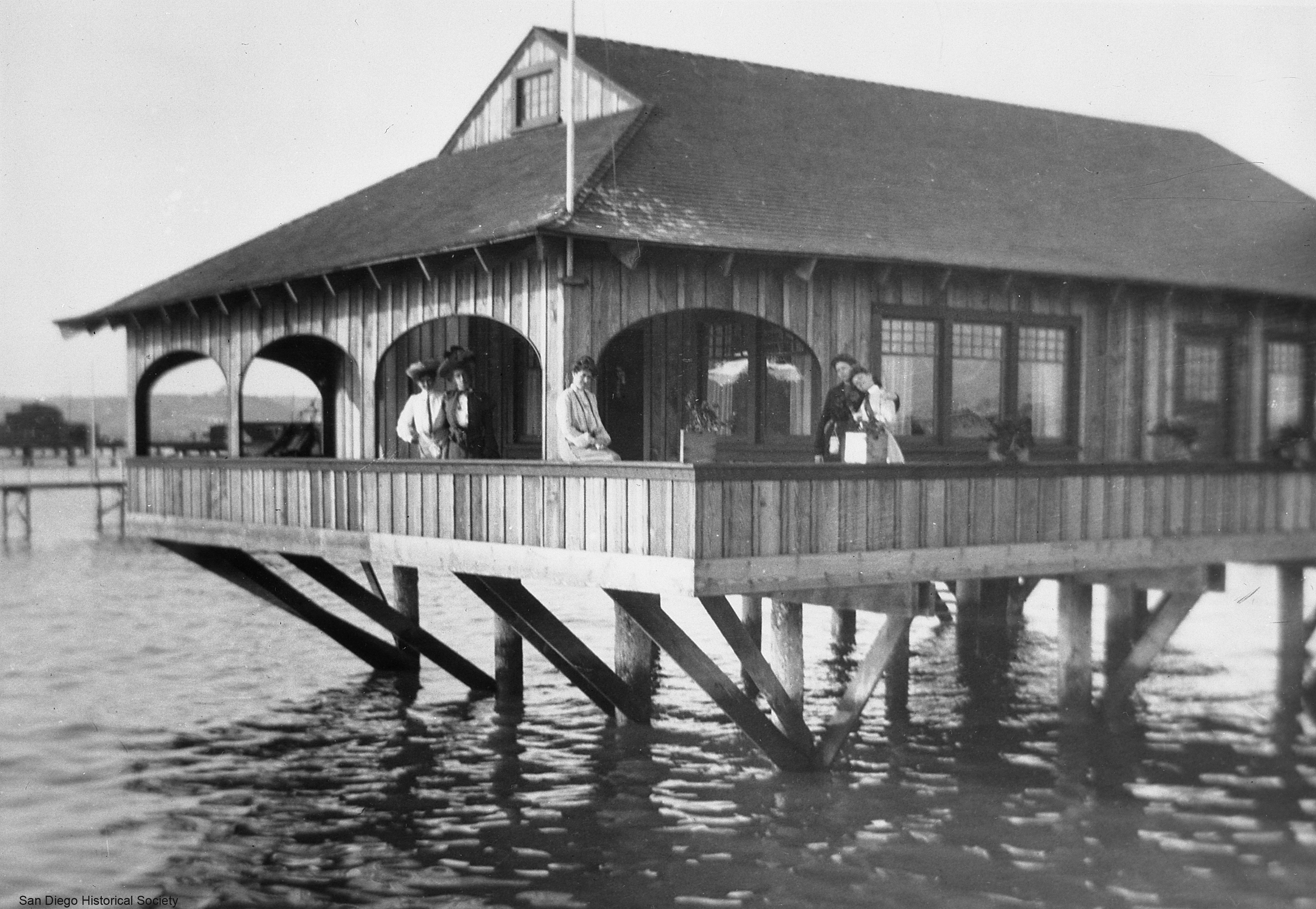
ZLAC Rowing Club, 1908, showing the clubhouse on San Diego Bay

In 1901, two other collegiate crews—the Mariners and the White Caps—were invited to join ZLAC, tripling the membership to 30 women. This expansion led to the formation of Crews I, II, and III, an organizational structure that endures today. By 1902, the club had their own boathouse located at the foot of H Street (now Market St.).

Like other Progressive Era clubwomen, ZLACs were engaged in community service and social reform efforts. They routinely rescued victims of swimming or boating accidents in San Diego Bay. They assisted victims of the 1906 San Francisco Earthquake and lent aid to local flood victims in Southern California. During World War I, ZLAC women were active in the American Red Cross and delivered care packages to San Diego's army and navy hospitals.

Founder Lena Polhamus, who was known as the "Commodore", remained actively involved in club leadership after her marriage to Warren Sefton Crouse in 1902. She continued to row and taught the next generation of Juniors. She also recognized that increased military activity in San Diego Bay would impact the future of the rowing club.

=== San Diego Bay to Mission Bay, 1920–1960 ===
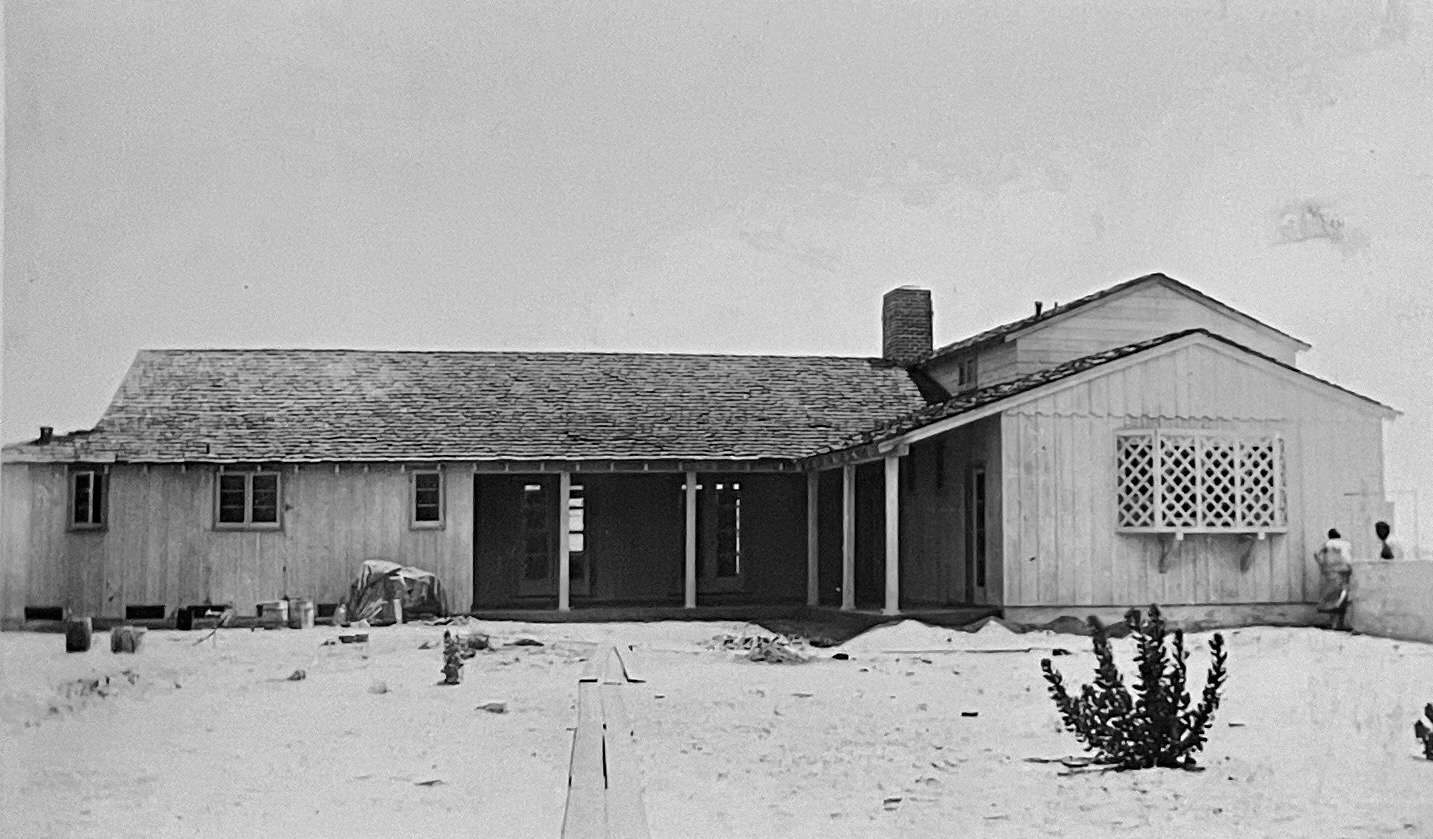
ZLAC Clubhouse (1932), architect Lilian J. Rice

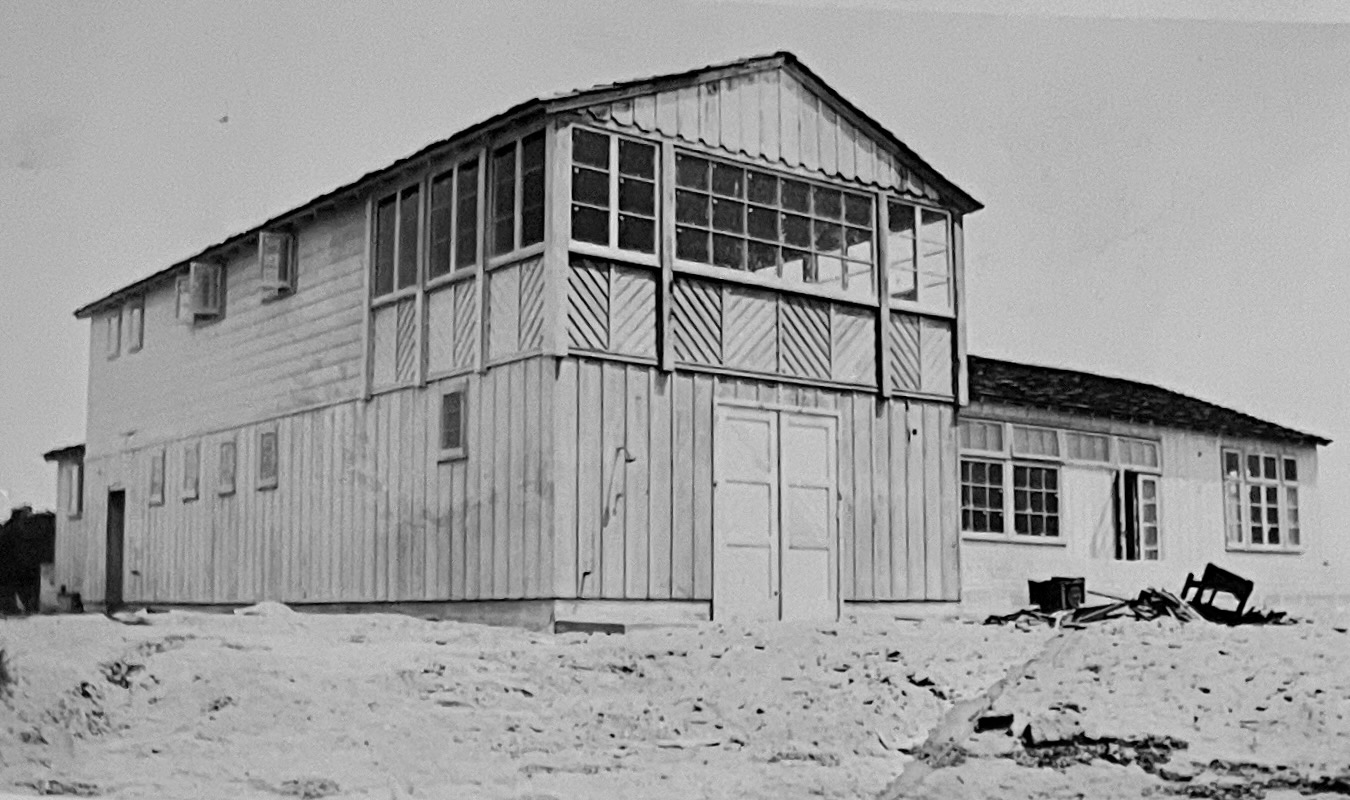
ZLAC Boathouse (1932), architect Lilian J. Rice

After World War I, San Diego was transformed into a major naval center. The Naval Training Center was established in 1919, followed by the Naval Base San Diego in 1922. The bay was dredged and expanded to accommodate large naval vessels, while new piers, dry docks, and support facilities transformed the waterfront.

In this context, ZLAC realized that they needed to move from their original bay front location to the quieter waters of Mission Bay. In the late 1920s, they purchased two lots at Dawes Street in Pacific Beach, at that time a remote and undeveloped area. This substantial investment demonstrated a commitment to long-term growth.

Despite the economic challenges of the Great Depression, ZLAC proceeded with their plan to build a new clubhouse. Architect Lilian Rice, a former ZLAC president, was commissioned to design the new space. Built of redwood to withstand the marine environment, the Ranch-style clubhouse encompassed a kitchen, a dining room, a lounge, changing rooms, and a boathouse. Rice's design won an honor award from the San Diego Chapter of the American Institute of Architects (AIA) in June 1933. The property was landscaped by horticulturalist Kate Sessions.

During World War II, the club opened its clubhouse to convalescing servicemen from the Naval Hospital so that they could enjoy the lounge, terrace, and beach. They aided the American Red Cross and hosted afternoon dances at the clubhouse.

ZLACs continued to row on Mission Bay, though they lacked deep water. At low tide, mud flats stretched as far as the eye could see. It would take several decades before dredging made it possible for the club to establish a competitive rowing program. In the meantime, the club made use of its new facilities to establish a social club with deep roots in San Diego's maritime community. By the 1950s, the club had expanded to nearly 500 members.

=== Competitive Awakening, 1960s–1970s ===
Women's sports underwent significant changes in the 1960s, going from a marginalized activity to a serious athletic endeavor that eventually gained legal protection and widespread acceptance. The women's sports revolution was deeply connected to the broader Civil Rights movement which moved women closer to legislative action for greater equal treatment in athletics. Meanwhile, the women's liberation movement of the late 1960s and 1970s provided crucial ideological support for women's sports equality.

In 1963, The National Women’s Rowing Association (NWRA) was founded in Oakland, California, to encourage women’s competitive rowing. Charter members included Lake Merritt Rowing Club, Philadelphia Girls' Rowing Club, and Lake Washington Rowing Club. The National Association of Amateur Oarsmen (NAAO) admitted the NWRA as a member in 1964, though they did not favor adding women to men's regattas. NWRA held the First National Women's Championship on June 18, 1966, on Green Lake in Seattle, Washington. In 1982, NWRA and NAAO merged to become USRowing.

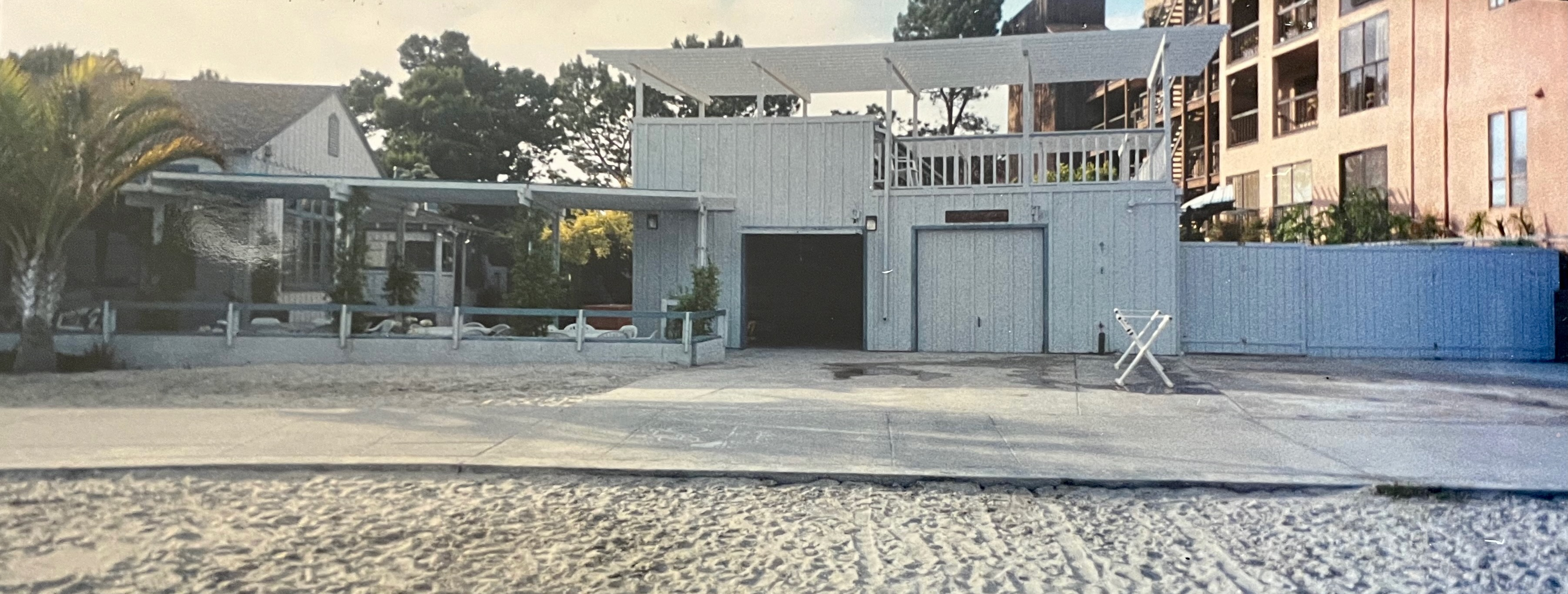
ZLAC Rowing Club, Boathouse (1962), architect Sim Bruce Richards

In 1962, ZLAC built a new boathouse on a vacant lot east of the clubhouse and converted the old boathouse into the Trophy Room. The 2,500-foot-square structure, designed by architect Sim Bruce Richards, housed ZLAC's barges and rowing shells.

ZLAC's Patty Stose Wyatt (1920–1999) organized the club's first competitive Junior crews. Up until that time, the club had been engaged in recreational rowing, intra-club competitions, and synchronized rowing exhibitions rather than the kind of competitive racing practiced by men. In 1963, ZLACs competed for the first time against a crew from Lake Merritt Rowing Club. They also began to participate in regional regattas.

Racing represented a cultural shift towards recognizing young women as athletes capable of competition. As with any change, there was pushback. By the mid-1970s, however, Juniors were competing in national and international championships and winning major awards.

Early on, ZLAC members became involved in national and international rowing organizations. In 1973, ZLAC's Debby Ayars De Angelis was selected to be one of five women officials in the NAAO; she also held many leadership positions in the NWRA, USRowing, and the World Rowing Federation (FISA).

=== The San Diego Crew Classic, 1973 ===
ZLAC's most significant contribution to American rowing came in 1973 with the founding of the San Diego Crew Classic. Patty Wyatt had the vision to bring together the best collegiate rowers—crews from both the East Coast and the West Coast—to San Diego. It was a bold idea. For more than a century, collegiate rowing had been dominated by elite East Coast programs with longstanding traditions and rivalries. Wyatt worked with Joe Jessop, Sr. (1931–2006) and other members of the San Diego Rowing Club to make this a reality. The impact was immediate and lasting. The regatta broke the East Coast monopoly on major rowing competitions and provided West Coast programs with a prestigious venue to showcase their talents. For ZLAC, it meant their home waters of Mission Bay became the center of American rowing each spring.

=== Olympic Recognition ===
The 1970s marked ZLAC's entrance into Olympic-level competition. Women's rowing was introduced to the Olympics in 1976, and ZLAC members were among the pioneers. Lynn Silliman Reed won bronze coxing the Women's 8+ in the 1976 Montreal Olympics. This was the first time the Olympics opened rowing events to women.

In 1984, Patty Wyatt was asked to run the 1984 Los Angeles Olympics rowing and canoe/kayak regattas, which were held at Lake Casitas in Ventura County, California. She was the first woman to be assigned a directorship of an Olympic event.

To date, six ZLAC members have competed for the US Olympic Team: Lynn Silliman Reed (1976 Montreal); Kelly Rickon Mitchell (1984 Los Angeles); Cathy Thaxton-Tippett (1984 Los Angeles and 1988 Seoul); Susan Francia (2008 Beijing and 2012 London); Kerry Simmonds (2016 Rio de Janeiro); Tracy Eisser (2016 Rio de Janeiro and 2020 Tokyo; and Megan Kalmoe (2012 London, 2016 Rio de Janeiro, 2020 Tokyo). Patty Wyatt ran the 1984 Los Angeles Olympics rowing and canoe/kayak regattas. Debby De Angelis, meanwhile, has served in a variety of leadership capacities (1976 Montreal, 1980 Moscow, 1988 Seoul, 1996 Atlanta, 2000 Sydney, 2004 Athens).

=== Title IX and Women's Rowing ===
Title IX, passed in 1972, had a transformative effect on women's sports nationwide. It provided legal backing for sports equality and validated women's participation in competitive sports. Compliance with Title IX became mandatory in 1978, leading to a boom in the number of girls and women in high school and collegiate sports.

ZLAC responded to the post-Title IX environment by expanding the Junior rowing program and professionalizing their approach to match the new seriousness of women's competitive rowing. In 2005, more than 50 girls between the ages of 14 and 18 rowed in ZLAC's Junior program.

=== Masters Rowing ===
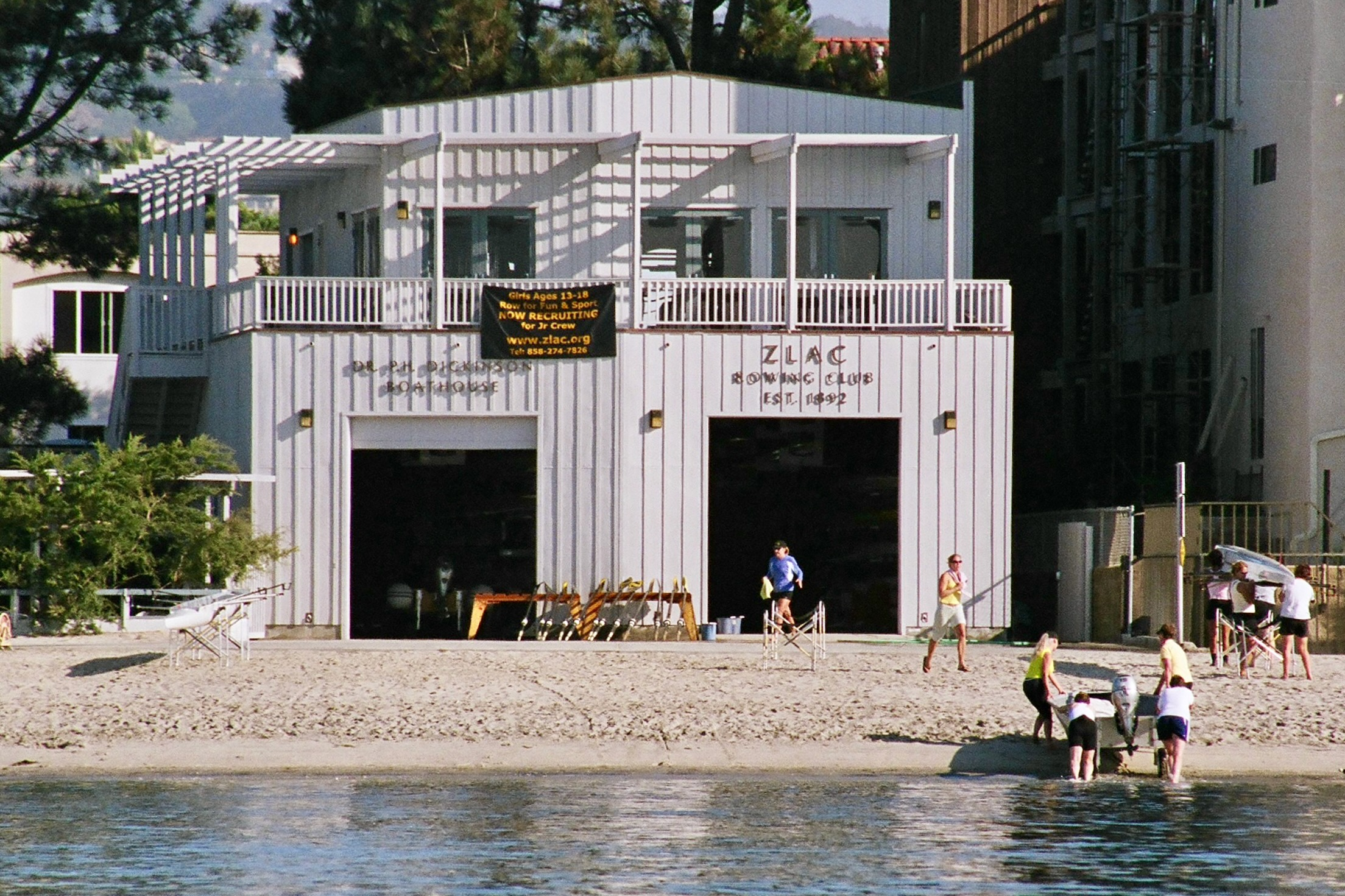
ZLAC Rowing Club Boathouse (2000), architect Scott Bernet

In 1986, ZLAC developed a Masters program for women over the age of 27. This was significant both for the club and for women's rowing more broadly. Traditionally, women's athletic participation was expected to end with marriage and motherhood, typically in the early to mid-twenties. The creation of a Masters program challenged this assumption and provided a pathway for lifelong athletic participation. It also changed ZLAC's membership profile and extended its reach.

In 2000, ZLAC hired architect Scott Bernet to rebuild the boathouse to accommodate the growing number of carbon-fiber reinforced polymer racing shells. The new boathouse was named in memory of Dr. P.H. Dickinson, father of a ZLAC member.

== Traditions ==
=== Salt Water Day ===
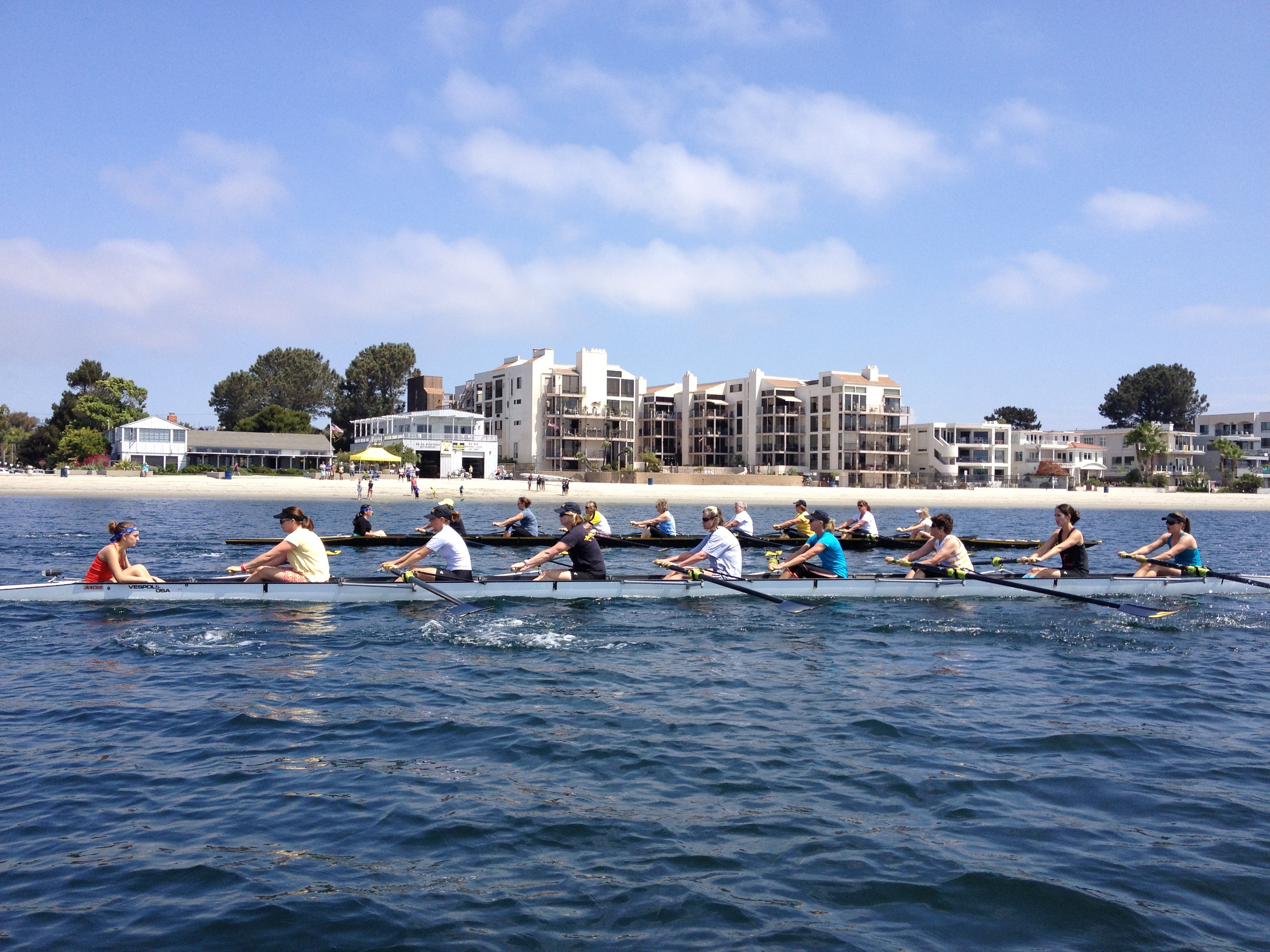
ZLAC Rowing Club, August 2016, Salt Water Day Races

ZLAC's annual Salt Water Day remains the most important event of the annual calendar.

Salt Water Day was first established in 1895 as a regatta in which local women's rowing clubs competed against one another. It included a barge race, an exhibition rowing event, and races in singles, doubles, and four-oared barges. By the early 1900s, Salt Water Day became an intra-club competition as many of the early women's rowing clubs had either disbanded or joined ZLAC. It continued as a social and competitive event with a brief interruption during World War II.

== ZLAC Foundation ==
The ZLAC Foundation is a separate 501(c)(3) nonprofit organization that works closely with ZLAC Rowing Club to support and expand rowing opportunities. It offers scholarships and free Learn to Row classes for girls 14 and older to help grow and diversify the sport of rowing. It operates an Oral History Project to interview women of the ZLAC Rowing Club with the aim of collecting and preserving the history of women's rowing. It also helps purchase boats for training and competition.

== Gallery ==
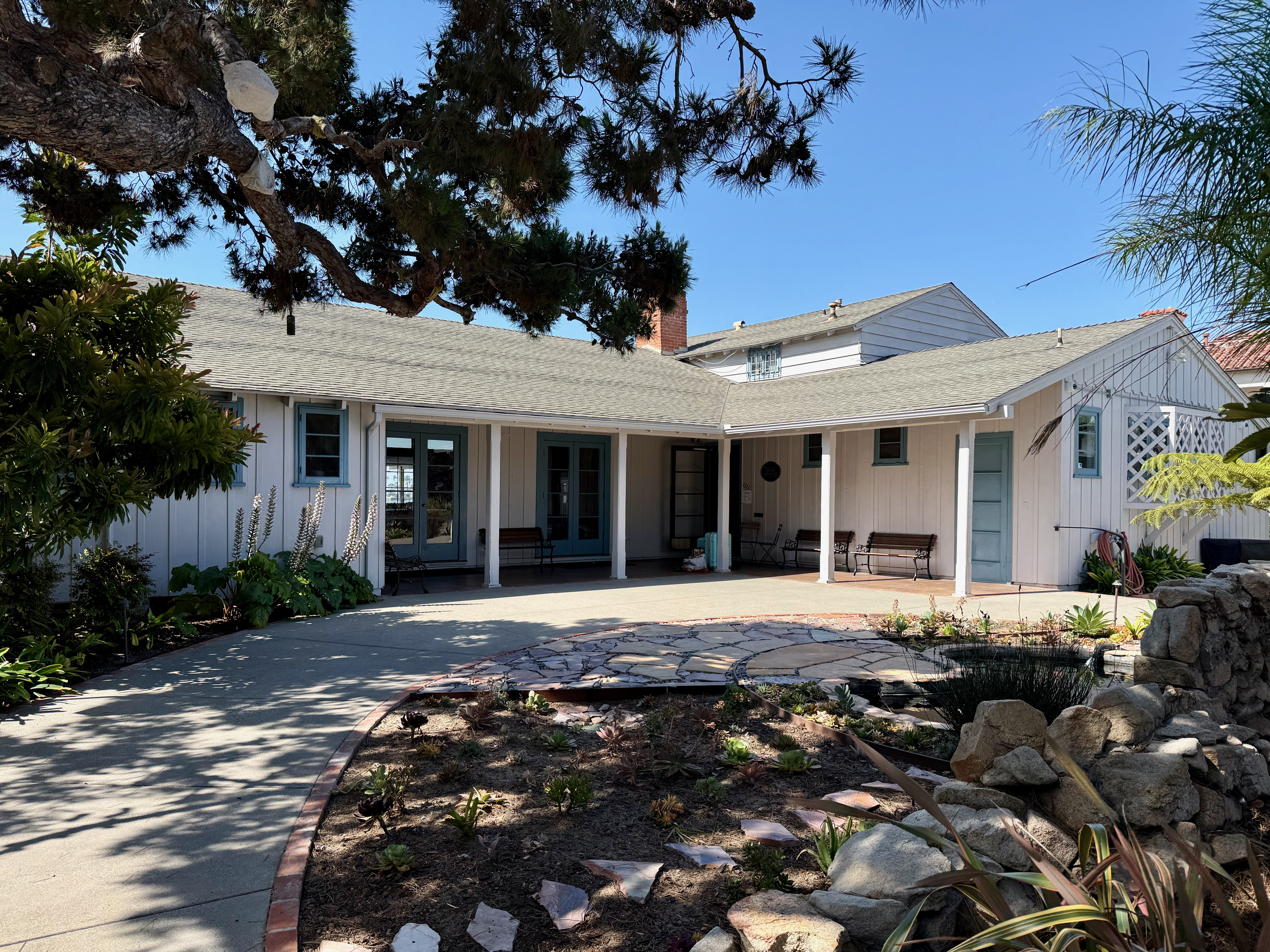
ZLAC Rowing Club, San Diego, CA, 2025

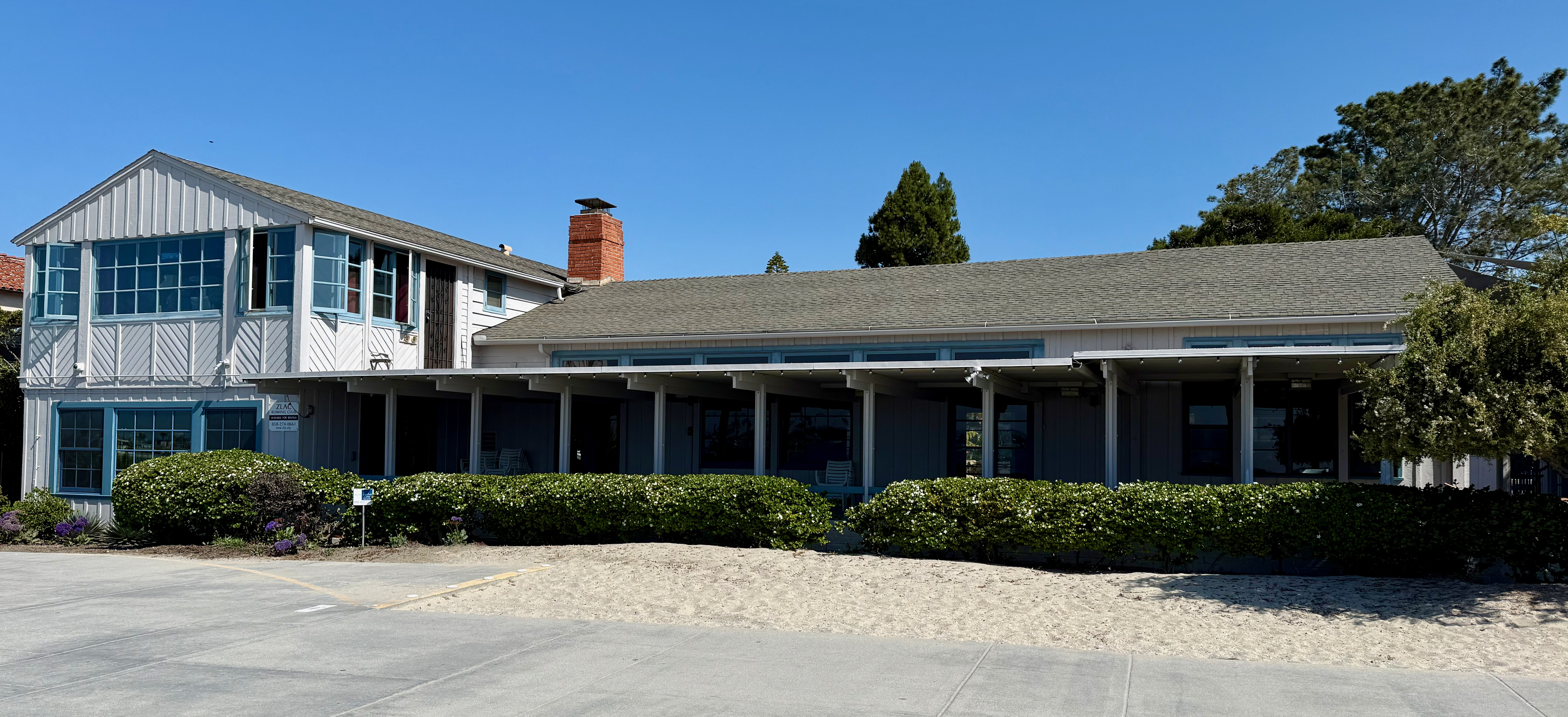
ZLAC Rowing Club, San Diego, CA, 2025, south-facing side of clubhouse

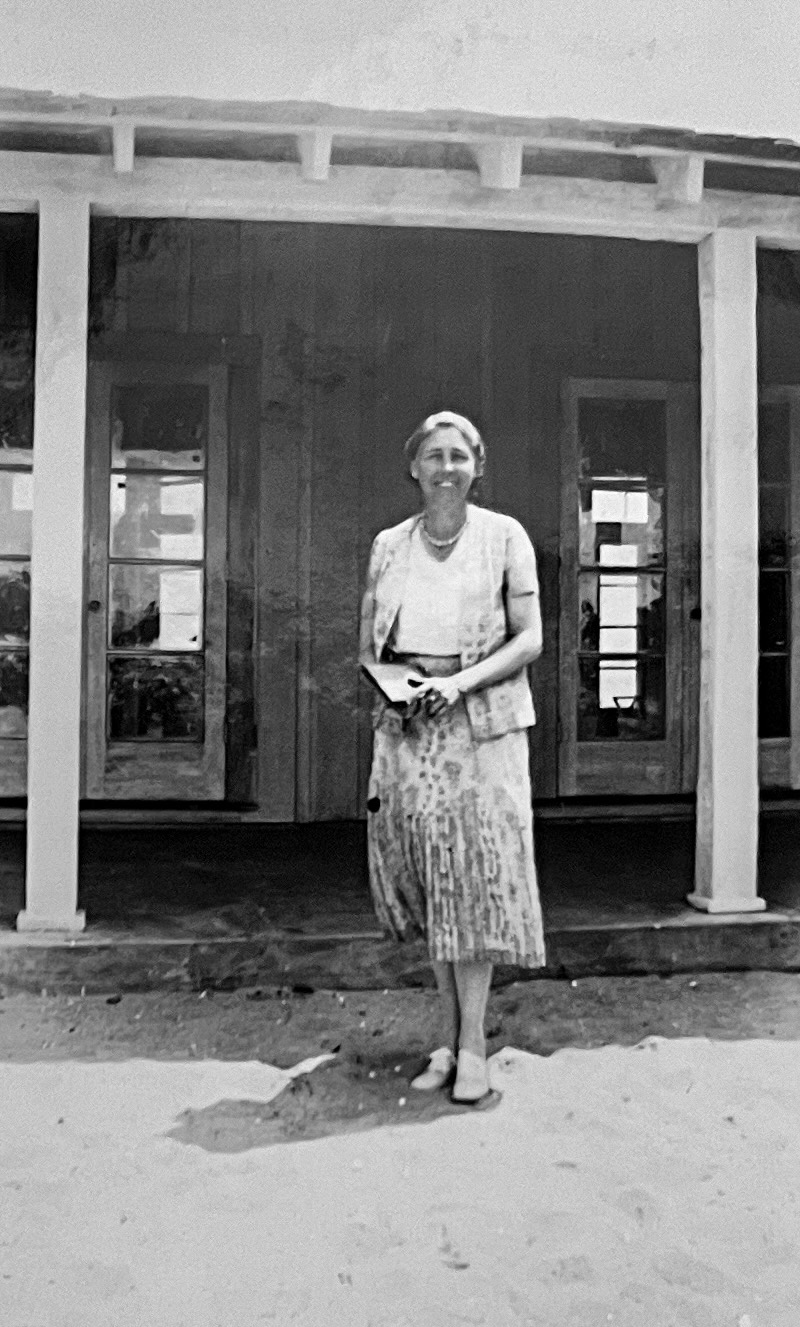
Architect Lilian J. Rice, 1932

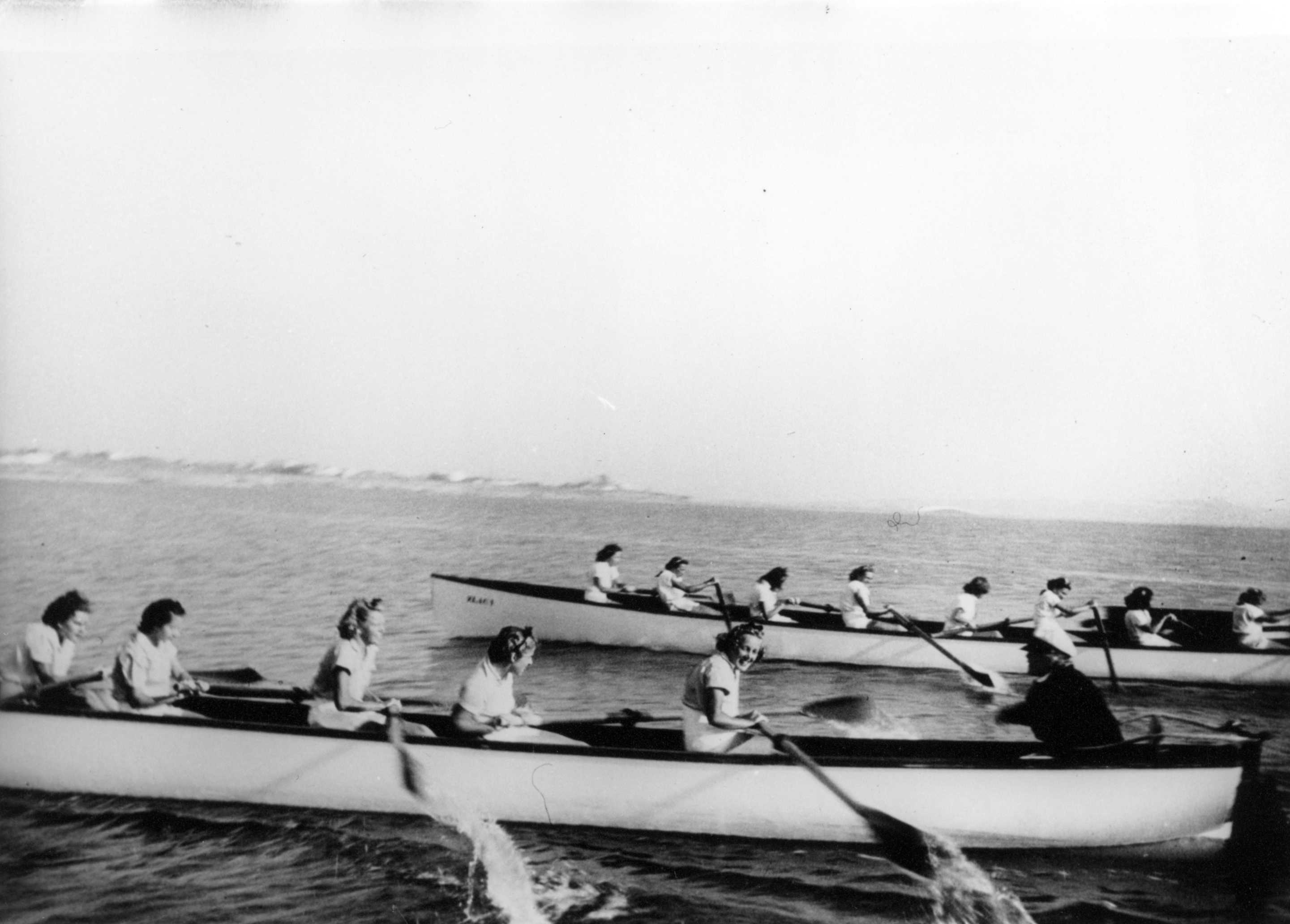
ZLAC Rowing Club, Salt Water Day competition, 1938

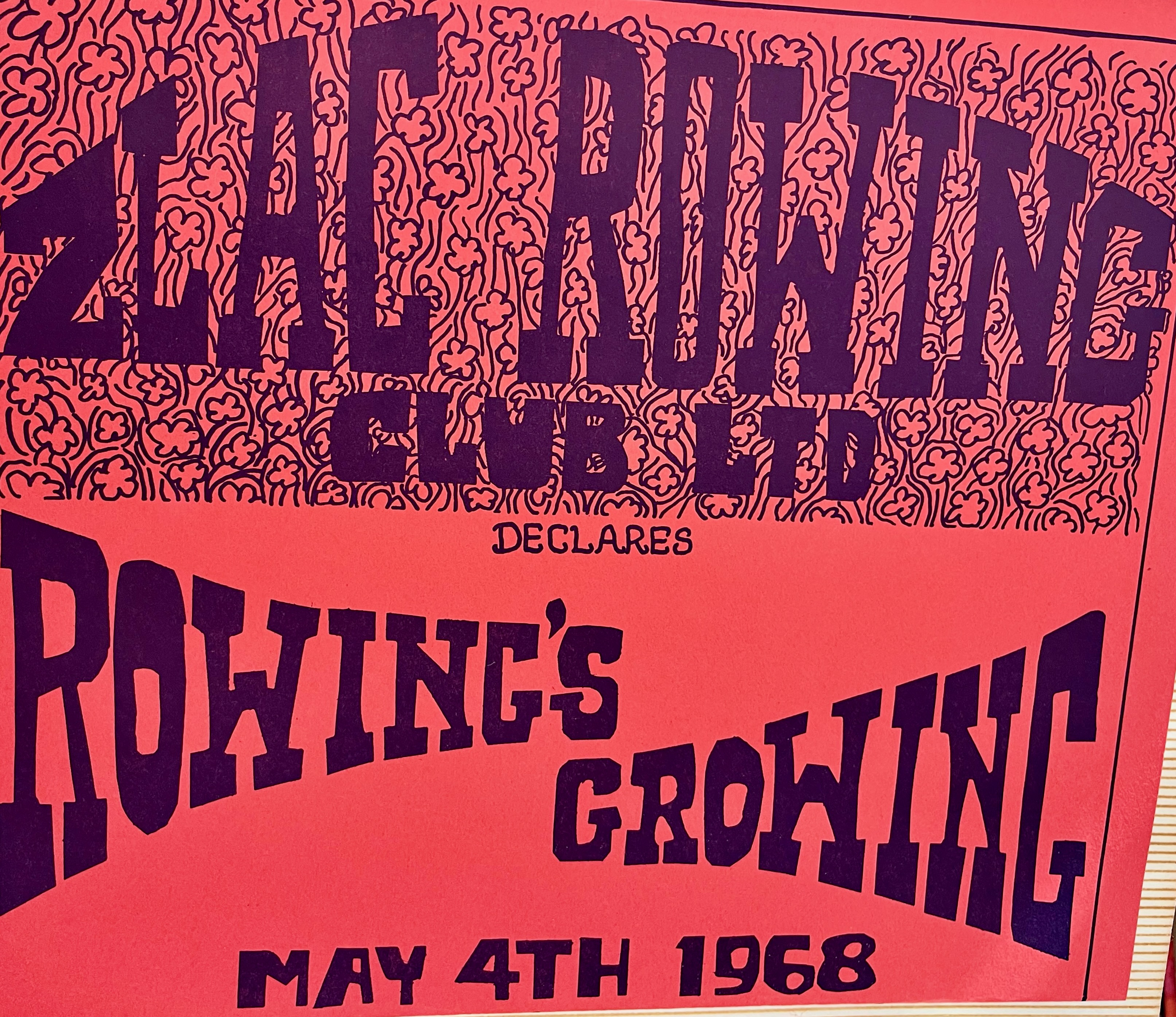
ZLAC Rowing Club, "Rowing's Growing" (1968), an early effort to promote women's competitive rowing and a San Diego regatta

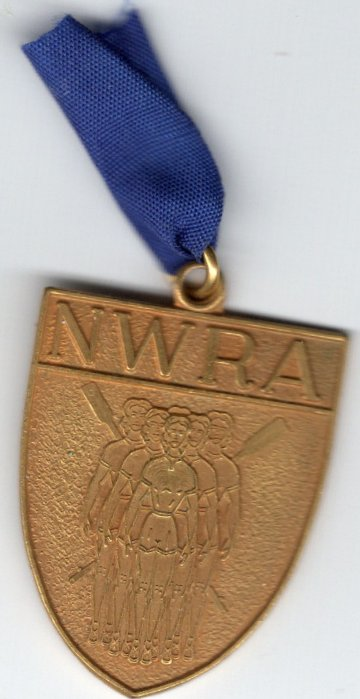
1975 National Women's Rowing Association (NWRA) National's Gold Medal for the Junior 8, ZLAC Rowing Club

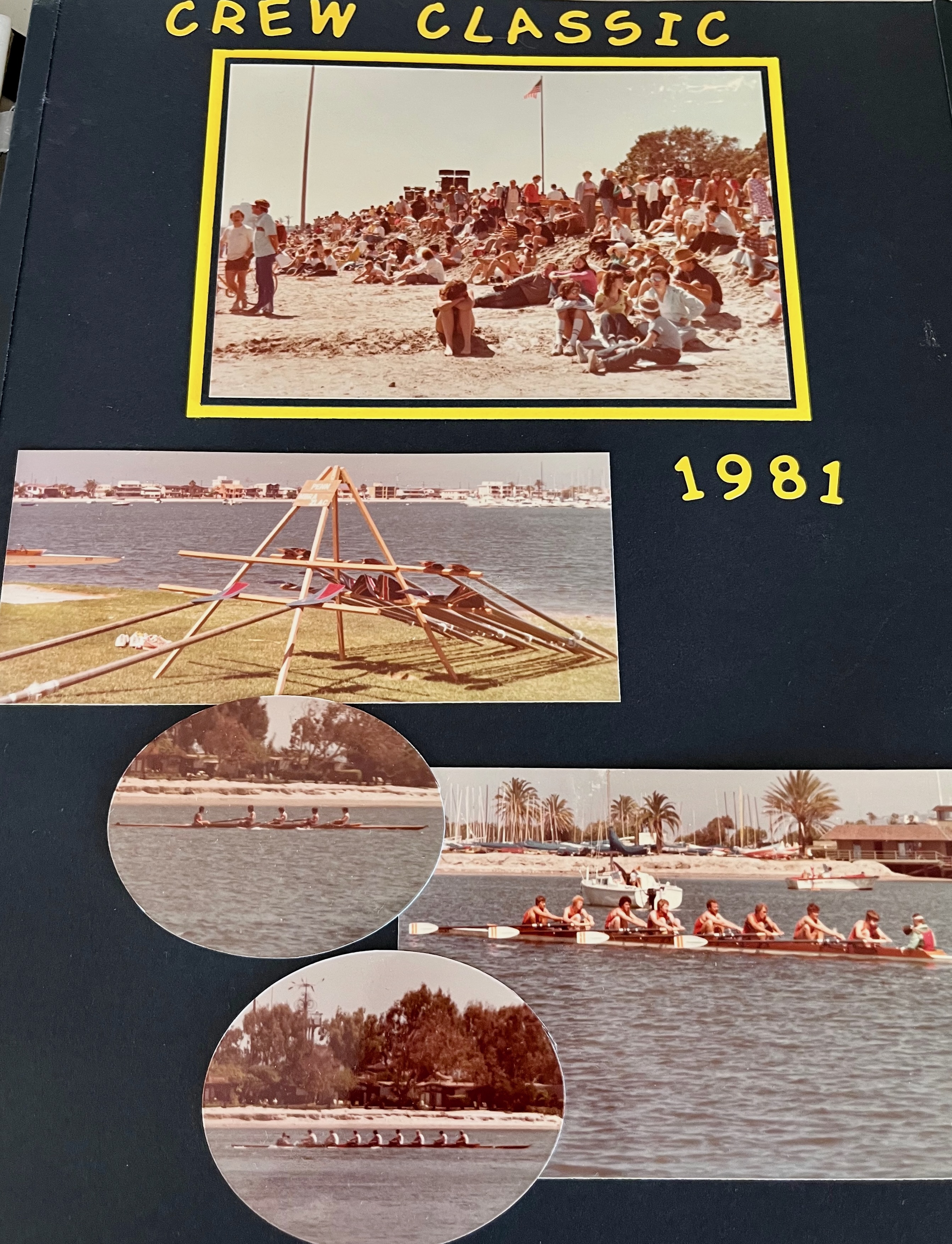
ZLAC Rowing Club scrapbook, San Diego Crew Classic, 1981

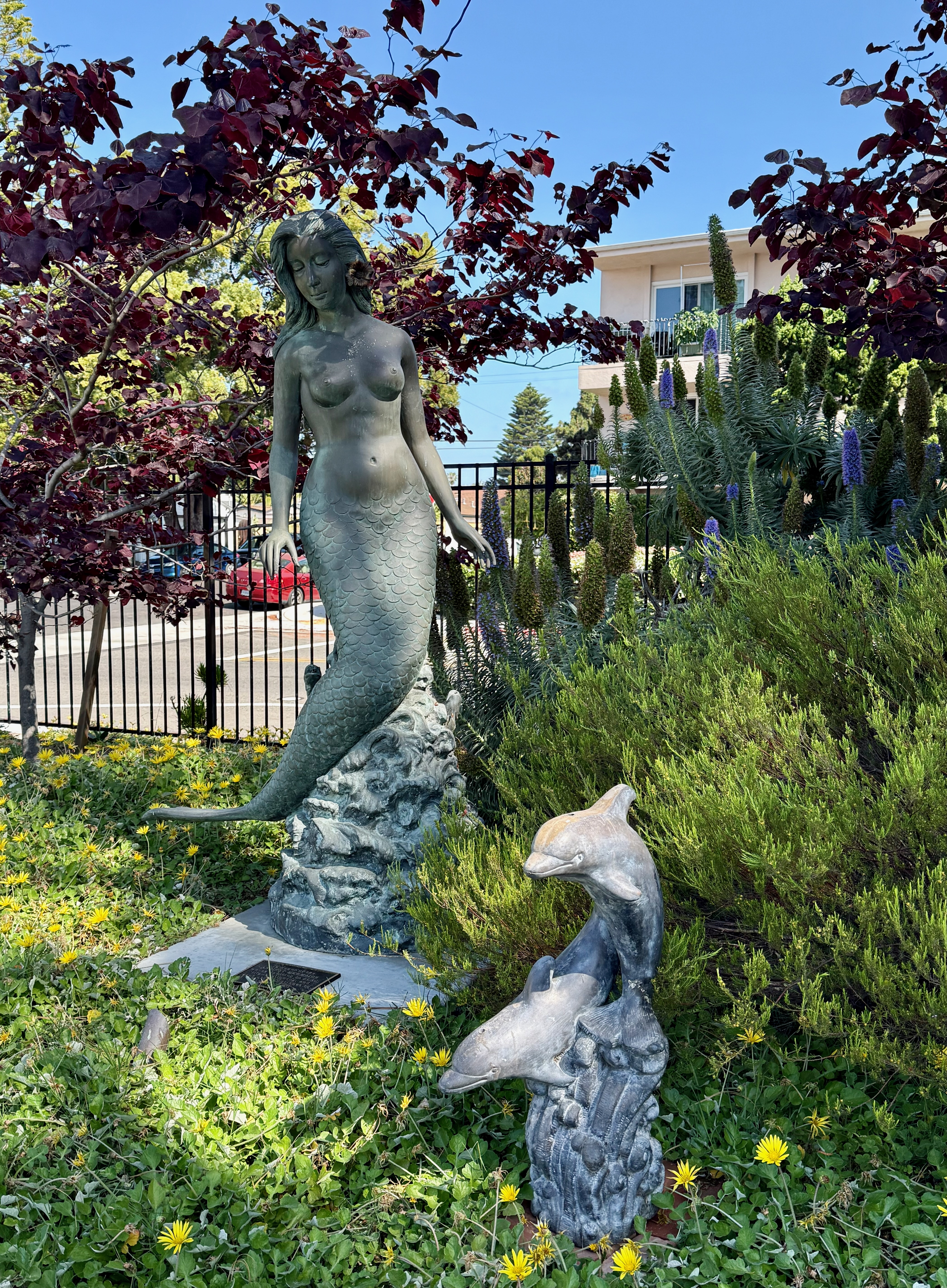
ZLAC Rowing Club, mermaid statue honoring the club's "Ancient Mermaids", women who rowed into their 80s

== See also ==
- Rowing (sport)
- History of rowing sports
- History of women's rowing
- Rower woman
