= National Women's Rowing Association =

Organization for women's rowing in the US

The National Women's Rowing Association (NWRA) was organized in 1963 to support and advance competitive women’s rowing in the United States. It was a central force in developing women’s rowing at the local, national, and international levels, including the decision to include women’s rowing in the 1976 Montreal Olympics. In 1982 the organization merged with the National Association of Amateur Oarsmen to form the United States Rowing Association (commonly referred to as USRowing), the current national governing body for the sport of rowing.

== History ==
The NWRA began organizing on behalf of women’s competitive rowing in 1963 through the efforts of Joanne Wright Iverson, of the Philadelphia Girls’ Rowing Club (PGRC), Ed Lickiss of Lake Merritt Rowing Club (LMRC), and Ted and Aldina Nash of Lake Washington Rowing Club (LWRC). The purpose of the group was to promote “rowing and sculling, regattas and the quality of American racing [for women] so that as a country we may better compete in the European Women's Championships and prepare for Olympic competition.” The charter member clubs were PGRC, LMRC, LWRC with Seattle Green Lake Junior Crew, Seattle Tennis Club, Mills College, Vancouver Rowing Club, and the ZLAC Rowing Club were early organizing members.

The NWRA held its first National Championship in 1966 in Seattle on Green Lake. The first annual regatta was a relatively small affair with only 8 participating clubs, 45 boats, and less than 100 competitors. The NWRA would continue sponsoring national championships annually until 1985, and they alternated between West Coast and East Coast sites until 1979 when several Mid West locales began to be added to the host roster. Particularly in the early years the national competitions featured a wide range of ages from high school rowers to married mothers of four like Olive Rieflin. Attempting to push international competition as well as national, in 1967 the organization sought to register the winning boat of eight women (plus coxswain, 8+) for the international European Championships in Vichy, France. While officials in the NAAO refused to allow the registration, the founder of the winning club (PGRC) Ernestine Bayer went around them. Seeking out the approval of International Rowing Federation (FISA) president Thomas Keller, she staged an exhibition race for the women at the Royal Canadian Henley Regatta, which they won against an international group of former Olympians and national champion men. The move worked, and Keller approved their bid to the international race, making the PGRC 8+ the first international race for U.S. women in rowing. While they came in last, they opened a path for women in the U.S. to push for more international competition.

National championship regattas were held by the NWRA over the next eight years in Oakland (three times), Philadelphia (twice), Lyme, CT, and Seattle (twice), and the event increased in size each time. By 1972, when it was announced that women's rowing would be added to the Olympics, the organization was also working hard to prepare championship boats for international competition. The 1975 National Championship, held in Princeton, NJ provided the opportunity to move toward a selection camp process whereby national champion winners would be crowned, but the entire event provided an opportunity for national team coaches to select the athletes that would attend a selection camp and compose boats based on individual ability. Prior to this, the winning boat in certain categories would be eligible for international competition; however, the NWRA and the Women's Olympic Rowing Committee had decided to change to a camp selection process to follow nationals. Vesper Boat Club legally challenged this decision and the courts offered their decision - if they won, the process would be reverted, but if not, the new selection camp would proceed. The Princeton-based nationals, held a little over a year prior to the coming Olympics, proved a critical contest that also ultimately showcased a number of the athletes that would go on to compete in Montreal including Princeton rower Carol Brown, Yale rower Anne Warner, and Wisconsin rowers Carie Graves and Jackie Zoch. The event, providing a young Wisconsin team with the opportunity for their first win in the 8+ category (besting Vesper), also marked the first deployment of the camp selection process for international competition.

Through the 1970s the NWRA fostered women's rowing growth through their support of clubs and college programs, and this development was supported by the passed of Title IX and the women's rights movement, According to Anna Seaton Huntington, the organization grew from under 500 members in 1972 to "more than one hundred member organizations with thousands of women on their rosters" ten years later. The annual regatta numbers showed that growth as well, with the 1978 regatta featuring 650 participants from 60 clubs racing across 130 different boats." While many of the NWRA member organizations were clubs that brought high school athletes and post-collegiate rowers to the sport, even more of them were collegiate programs like Princeton, Yale, Boston University, the University of Washington, and many other schools that had added women's rowing in the early to mid-1970s and turned to the NWRA for competition opportunities. In 1980 the NWRA sponsored the first all-collegiate national championship at Melton Lake in Oak Ridge, Tennessee.

Moreover, many NWRA members were actively involved in pushing for greater international racing opportunities for women, including at the Olympics. While the official decision to incorporate women's rowing into Olympic competition occurred at the upper levels of the international sports world, U.S. women did seek to put pressure on their male counterparts in the sport to support decisions that advance their cause. Gail Pierson Cromwell, a Harvard Economics professor, was one of the leaders of the organization in the 1970s who supported this effort. She served as NWRA President in 1972-1973 and formed the first women's Olympic Rowing Committee. When U.S. women joined the Olympic program in 1976 NWRA founder Joanne Wright Iverson served as one of the team's managers.

Through the end of the1970s and into the early 1980s the NWRA continued to serve as a promoter and organizer of women's rowing across the United States.

== Merger ==
In 1982 the NWRA merged with the all-men's NAAO to form the U.S. Rowing Association. However, the organization did not fully dissolve until 1987 when several of their conditions had been met by the governing body, including a regionalized structure and the appointment of a Vice President of Women's Rowing.
