= Nobuhisa Ishizuka =

American attorney and legal scholar

Nobuhisa Ishizuka is an American attorney, academic administrator, and legal scholar specializing in Japanese law, comparative law, and Asian security policy. He is the Executive Director of the Center for Japanese Legal Studies and a Lecturer in Law at Columbia Law School, and serves on the Executive Committee of the Board of Directors of the Japanese American Association of New York. Before joining academia, he was a Partner of Skadden, Arps, Slate, Meagher & Flom.

Ishizuka’s work focuses on U.S.–Japan legal exchange, international business law, and scholarship on Japan’s security legislation. He has held leadership positions in national and international rowing organizations, having served as Chair and President of USRowing’s Board of Directors and later appointed a Council Member at World Rowing.

== Early life and education ==
Ishizuka earned his B.A. from Columbia College, majoring in East Asian Studies and studying Japanese language, literature, and history.

He subsequently completed a J.D. at Columbia Law School, where he served as Senior Editor of the Columbia Law Review.

Following law school, he studied at the University of Tokyo, Faculty of Law as a Graduate Research Student. Earlier, he received a Japan Foundation Scholarship to study at the Inter-University Center for Japanese Language Studies in Tokyo.

== Career ==
Ishizuka joined Columbia Law School in 2018 as Executive Director of the Center for Japanese Legal Studies, becoming the third person to lead the center since its founding in 1980. In this role, he oversees research programs, academic partnerships, and international exchanges related to U.S.–Japan legal scholarship. He also teaches as a Lecturer in Law, focusing on comparative law, Asian security policy, and the Japanese constitution.

He is co-editor of Strengthening the U.S.–Japan Alliance: Pathways for Bridging Law and Policy (Columbia University 2020), a volume published in collaboration with Columbia’s National Security Law Program and Japan’s National Defense Academy.

From 2000 to 2017, Ishizuka served as a Partner in Skadden’s Tokyo, Hong Kong, and New York offices, [2]

== Scholarship and publications ==
- U.S. Shareholder Activism: Convergence with Japan (J. Japan. L., 2025, forthcoming)
- Existential Threats and Deterrence: Japan’s Legal Pathway to Enhanced Collective Security in Asia, American University International Law Review (2025)
- Doctrinal Conflict in Foreign Investment Regulation in India: U. Pa. J. Int’l L. (2022)
- Strengthening the U.S.–Japan Alliance (Co-Editor, 2020)
- Constitutional Reform in Japan,” Columbia Journal of Asian Law (2019)

== Leadership in sports governance ==
Ishizuka has been active in national and international rowing organizations:

- World Rowing – Council Member (Appointed 2025); Strategic Projects Advisor (2024–2025)
- US Rowing's Chair and President, Board of Directors (2021–2024); Chair of the Governance Committee (2018–2021)
- National Rowing Foundation – Board of Directors (Appointed 2018).

== Awards and recognitions ==
His honors include

- FT Asia-Pacific Innovative Lawyers Award (2014)
- India Business Law Journal Deal of the Year (2008)
