= Rowing in the United States =

- Country: United States
- Governing body: USRowing
- National team: United States Olympics team

International competitions
- Summer Olympics; World Rowing Championships

In the United States, Crew or Rowing is a popular sport in secondary and tertiary education. USRowing is the sport's national governing body. The Harvard-Yale Regatta is the oldest college sporting event in the United States.

== History ==
The American Henley Regatta was the first national championships for the sport of rowing in the United States. The first regatta was held in 1903 in Philadelphia, and was meant to be equivalent to the Henley Royal Regatta in the United Kingdom. The regatta was alternately held in Philadelphia and Boston. It was run by the American Rowing Association.

== High school ==
High schools compete in rowing at the national level in the Stotesbury Cup and Scholastic Rowing Association of America regattas.

== College ==
Rowing is the oldest intercollegiate sport in the United States. Men's rowing has organized collegiate championships in various forms since 1871. The Intercollegiate Rowing Association (IRA) has been the de facto national championship for men since 1895. Women's rowing initially competed in its intercollegiate championships as part of the National Women's Rowing Association Championship in 1967. In the 1996–97 season, most women's intercollegiate rowing programs elected to join the NCAA as a "Championship" sport. Men's rowing declined to join the NCAA, but virtually all colleges abide by NCAA regulations. Other governing bodies of college rowing in the United States include the American Collegiate Rowing Association (ACRA).

== Olympics ==
The women's eight has won the gold medal at the 2008, 2012 and 2016 Olympics.
