= History of rowing sports =

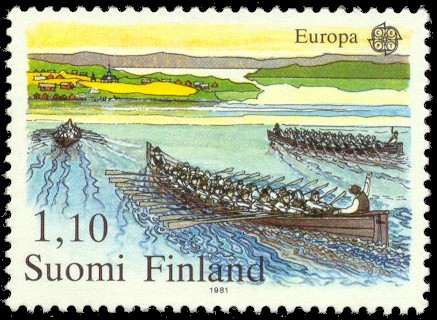
Rowing stamp from Finland.

The history of rowing as a sport has prevailed it as one of the oldest traditions in the world. What began as a method of transport and warfare eventually became a sport with a wide following, and a part of the cultural identity of the English speaking world. Rowing in its modern form developed in England in the 1700s.

Today rowing is an amateur sport and an Olympic event. When Pierre de Coubertin created the Modern Olympics, he modelled the International Olympic Committee on the Henley Stewards. The stewards organise the Henley Royal Regatta, one of rowing's most prestigious events.

== Men's ==
Even since the earliest recorded references to rowing, the sporting element has been present. An Egyptian funerary inscription of 1430 BC records that the warrior Amenhotep (Amenophis) II was also renowned for his feats of oarsmanship. In the Aeneid, Virgil mentions rowing forming part of the funeral games arranged by Aeneas in honour of his father.

In the 13th century, Venetian festivals called regata included boat races among others. Nowadays, rowing competitions are still called regattas (with a second 't' added).

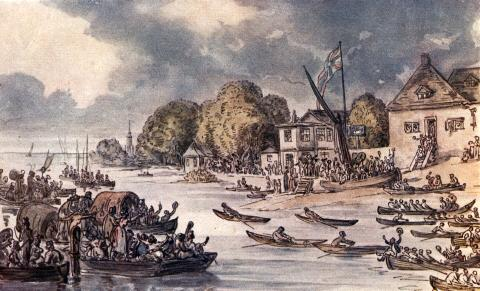
The finish of the Doggett's Coat and Badge. Painting by Thomas Rowlandson.

The first known 'modern' rowing races, began from competition among the professional watermen that provided ferry and taxi service on the River Thames in London. Prizes for wager races were often offered by the London Guilds and Livery Companies or wealthy owners of riverside houses. (ref, The Brilliants p14). During the 19th century these races were to become numerous and popular, attracting large crowds. A contemporary sporting book lists 5000 such matches in the years 1835 to 1851. Prize matches amongst professionals similarly became popular on other rivers throughout Great Britain in the 19th century, notably attracting vast crowds on the Tyne. The oldest surviving such race, Doggett's Coat and Badge was first contested in 1715 and is still held annually from London Bridge to Chelsea.

Amateur competition in England began towards the end of the 18th century. Documentary evidence from this period is sparse, but it is known that the Monarch Boat Club of Eton College and the Isis Club of Westminster School were both in existence in the 1790s. The Star Club and Arrow Club in London for gentlemen amateurs were also in existence before 1800. At the University of Oxford bumping races were first organised in 1815 while at Cambridge the first recorded races were in 1827. The Boat Race between Oxford University and Cambridge University first took place in 1829, and was the second intercollegiate sporting event (following the first Varsity Cricket Match by 2 years). The interest in the first Boat Race and subsequent matches led the town of Henley to begin hosting an annual regatta in 1839.

In America, there is also a sizable rowing community. Ports such as Boston, New York, and Philadelphia required the building of many small rowing boats, and competition was inevitable. The first American race took place on the Schuylkill River in 1762 between 6-oared barges. As the sport gained popularity, clubs were formed and scullers began racing for prizes. Professionals were rowing against clubs and each other before the civil war. Races were often round trips to a stake and back, so that the start and finish could be watched. The public flocked to such events, and rowing was as popular in America during the 19th century as other professional sports are today. In 1824, ferrymen from the Whitehall Landing at Manhattan's Battery raced a crew from the British frigate HMS Hussar for $1,000. Thousands bet on the event and the Americans won. In 1838, six men formed the Narragansett Boat Club in Providence and today Narragansett Boat Club is the oldest rowing club, and the oldest athletic club in America. In 1843, the first American college rowing club was formed at Yale University. The Harvard–Yale Regatta is the oldest intercollegiate sporting event in the United States having been contested every year since 1852 (except for occasional breaks due to major wars, such as World War II and the US Civil War). The oldest inter-high school competition in the United States also occurred on the water, in the form of a race in six-man boats between two New England boarding schools: Phillips Exeter Academy in Exeter, New Hampshire, and Phillips Academy Andover in Andover, Massachusetts. The oldest continuous rowing club in America is the Narragansett Boat Club, in Providence, Rhode Island, founded in 1838.

FISA, the "Fédération Internationale des Sociétés d’Aviron" in French (or the English equivalent International Federation of Rowing Associations) was founded by representatives from France, Switzerland, Belgium, Adriatica (now a part of Italy) and Italy in Turin on 25 June 1892. It is the oldest international sports federation in the Olympic movement.

FISA first organised a European Rowing Championships in 1893. An annual World Rowing Championships was introduced in 1962. Rowing has also been conducted at the Olympic Games since 1900 (canceled at the first modern Games in 1896 due to bad weather).

Strong rowing nations include Great Britain, the United States, Italy, Netherlands, France, Canada, Germany, New Zealand, Australia, and Romania. Well-known rowers of recent years include Sir Steve Redgrave (UK), who won Olympic golds in five successive Olympics; Sir Matthew Pinsent (UK), who won golds in four successive Olympics; James Tomkins (Australia), three times Olympic gold medalist; Rob Waddell (New Zealand) and Xeno Müller (Switzerland), opponents in the single sculls.

== Women's ==
For most of its history, rowing has been a male dominated sport. Although rowing's roots as a sport in the modern Olympics can be traced back to the original 1896 games in Athens, it was not until the 1976 Summer Olympics in Montreal that women were allowed to participate – well after their fellow athletes in similar sports such as swimming, athletics, cycling, and canoeing.

Women have competed in rowing events as far back as the fifteenth century. When Beatrice d'Este visited Venice in 1493, a regatta was held in which fifty peasant women competed. There were professional women rowers, referred to as Roddarmadam, managing and dominating the water ferry in the archipelago of the Swedish capital of Stockholm from the 15th century up until the late 19th century. Women's rowing in modern times can be traced back to the early 19th century, and an image of a women's double scull race made the cover of Harper's Weekly in 1870. St Hugh's College, Oxford owned a boat for use by its women students as early as 1891; it was stored at the River Cherwell and students "who can swim 50 feet" were permitted to use it. In 1892 four young women (Zulette Lamb and Lena, Agnes, and Caroline Polhamus) started ZLAC Rowing Club in San Diego, California when they borrowed a boat and began rowing on San Diego Bay. The club considers itself the oldest all-women's rowing club in continuous existence in the world. Newnham College Boat Club was formed the following year in Cambridge, England. Furnivall Sculling Club is widely considered to have established the world's first female rowing team (crew) in 1896. In 1927, the first Women's Boat Race between Oxford and Cambridge universities was held (for the first few years it was an exhibition, and it later became a race). And in 1954, the women's events were added to the European Rowing Championships. In 1988, the first Henley Women's Regatta was held. On 27 April 1997, one of the last bastions of rowing was breached when, at an Extraordinary General Meeting, Leander Club voted to admit women as members. This rule met a condition imposed by UK Sport and qualified Leander to receive a £1.5 million grant for refurbishment from the Lottery Sports Fund. In 2015, the Women's Boat Race was combined with the men's race on the River Thames in London.

At international level, women's rowing was dominated by Eastern European countries, such as Romania, Russia, and Bulgaria, until the collapse of the communism. Since then the most successful rowing nations have included Germany, Netherlands, Canada, Great Britain and New Zealand: countries that have rivers and lakes suitable for rowing on. The United States also has often had very competitive crews, and in recent years these crews have become even more competitive given the surge in women's collegiate rowing, and the establishment of the NCAA Rowing Championships for women.

Well-known rowers of recent years include Ekaterina Karsten (Belarus) in women's single sculls; Kathrin Boron (Germany) in women's double sculls and quadruples.

== See also ==
- Henley Royal Regatta
- The Boat Race
