= Center for International Legal Studies =

The Center for International Legal Studies (CILS) is a non-profit research, training, and law publications institute, established and operating under Austrian law. Its international headquarters are in Salzburg, Austria. The Center has operated from there since 1976.

The Center for International Legal Studies cooperates internationally with numerous institutions of higher legal education, lawyers' professional associations and international organisations such as UNCITRAL, the ITU, and WIPO and has participated in the United Nations' Information Technology Summits (WSIS) in Geneva and Tunis. It administers programs with inter alia the Salzburg Global Seminar, King's College London School of Law, Boston University School of Law, the University of Buenos Aires Faculty of Law, Suffolk University Law School, the Korean Commercial Arbitration Board, and the Iranian Central Bar Association.

The essential purpose of the Center for International Legal Studies is the promotion of the dissemination of information among members of the international legal community. This is achieved through legal research and publication projects, the administration of post-graduate and professional training programs, and the operation of continuing legal education conferences each year. More than 5,000 lawyers worldwide have been designated as Honorary Fellows of the Center for International Legal Studies in recognition of their contributions to the Center's publications and conferences. Nearly 500 Honorary Fellows have taken membership in the Congress of Fellows. CILS established the International Business Law Consortium (IBLC) in 1996 as a means of assisting law firms affiliated with the Center to participate in and further its programs, and to translate these benefits to the delivery of transnational legal services.
