= USRowing Summer National Championships =

Annual rowing contest

The USRowing Summer National Championships is an annual national championship contest in the sport of rowing hosted by the United States Rowing Association. The 2022 regatta was held on Mercer Lake in West Windsor, NJ.

== History ==
The National Association of Amateur Oarsmen, predecessor of the USRA, first held a National Championship regatta in 1873.

As early as 1999, the USRA held separate "Club National Championships" ("Club Nats") and National Championships events. The National Championships was called "Elite National Championships" starting in 2007. Club Nationals was intended for youth, intermediate, and senior level athletes, while Elite Nationals was intended for elite athletes. Elite level events were added to Club Nationals in 2016 and the Elite Championship regatta was eliminated. The name of the regatta was changed to "National Championships" in 2019 to reflect the inclusion of elite events, and the regatta was expanded from five to six days. In 2021, the name was changed to "Summer National Championships." In 2022, USRowing split the regatta into separate "Youth Summer National Championships" and "Summer National Championships" in order to avoid a six-day long regatta, which had become exhausting to venues and participants. In 2023, the event will be recombined to a single USRowing Summer National Championships. In 2024, the event will be replaced by the RowFest Summer Championships, which will last ten days and include entertainment and development opportunities as well as championship racing. The program head at the time for USRowing, Derek P. Chytil, wanted to realize this change to prevent the national event from becoming one "based soly on a clubs ability to fund their operations".
