= USRowing =

National governing body for the sport of rowing in the United States

United States Rowing Association
- Shea Rowing Center on Lake Carnegie in Princeton, New Jersey, home to Princeton University Rowing and the US Women's National Team

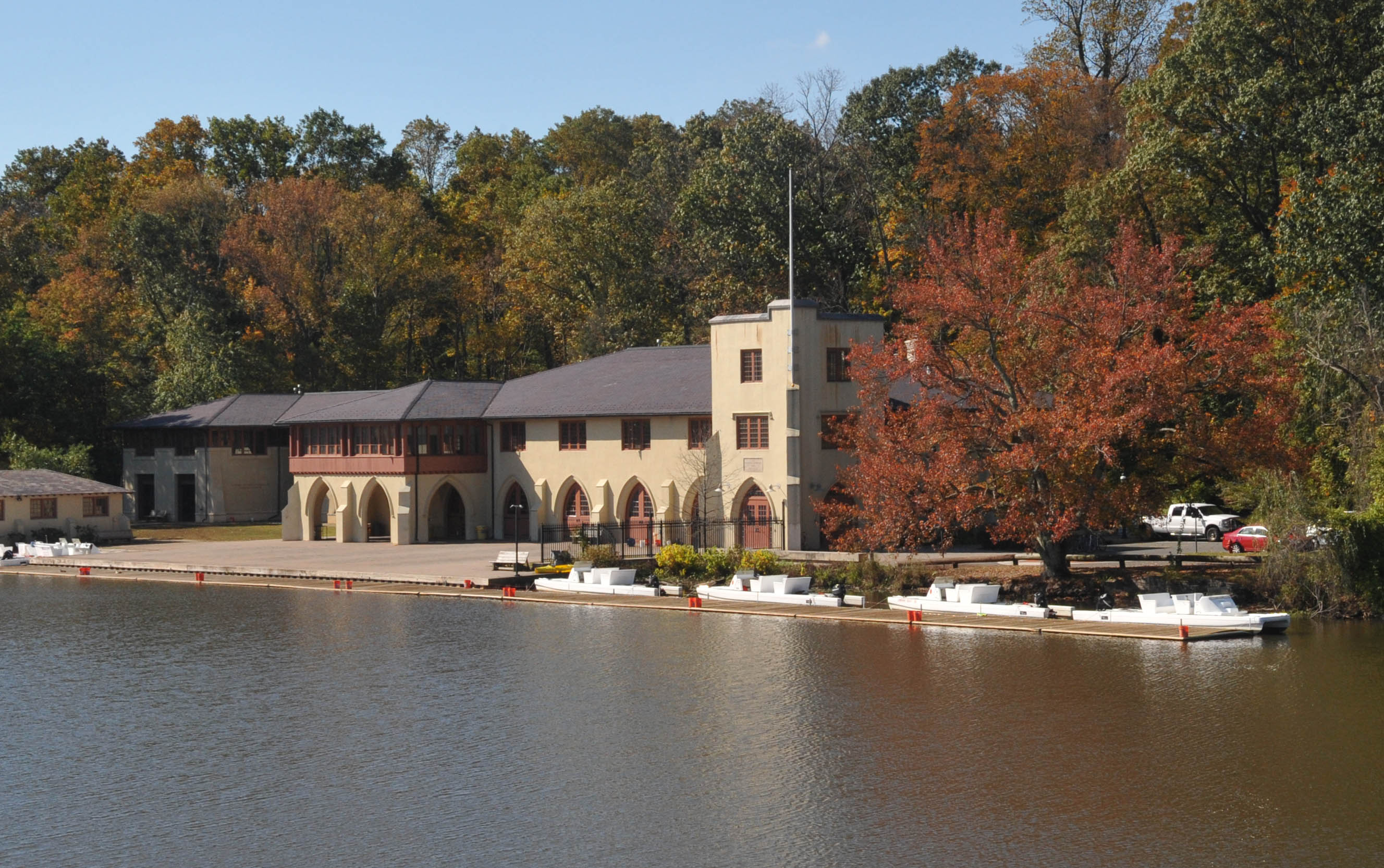
- Sport: Rowing
- Jurisdiction: United States of America
- Abbreviation: USRowing
- Founded: 1982
- Affiliation: International Rowing Federation
- Headquarters: Princeton, New Jersey, U.S.
- President: Nobuhisa Ishizuka
- Chairman: Nobuhisa Ishizuka
- CEO: Amanda Kraus

Official website
- www.usrowing.org
- (United States)

The United States Rowing Association, commonly known as USRowing, is the national governing body for the sport of rowing in the United States. It serves to promote the sport on all levels of competition, including the selection and training of those athletes who represent the US at international level.

In 1982, the United States Rowing Association was formed by the merger of the National Association of Amateur Oarsmen, founded in 1872, and the National Women's Rowing Association, established in 1963. In 1985, the organization moved from Philadelphia to Indianapolis, home of several other Olympic sport governing bodies. In 1994, Indianapolis became the first U.S. city to host a world rowing championship. Nathan Benderson Park in Sarasota, Fla., hosted the 2017 world rowing championship. In 2006, USRowing moved its corporate headquarters to Princeton, N.J., home of the USRowing National Team Training Center.

USRowing registers more than 185 regattas across the country each year, ensuring they are run under specific safety guidelines. The association also provides programs to educate referees and coaches. USRowing also runs several regattas, including the USRowing National Championships, regional and national championships for masters and youth athletes, and the USRowing Indoor National Championships in partnership with the CRASH-B Sprints.

USRowing is also responsible for national team selection, and runs events to identify and select national team athletes including the National Selection Regatta and olympic trials.

USRowing is a member of the United States Olympic Committee and the International Rowing Federation.

== Membership ==
USRowing offers both individual and organizational membership opportunities. With more than 14,000 individual members and 1,050 organizational members, USRowing membership is at the core of its mission.

USRowing individual membership offers opportunities to race in USRowing's national and regional regattas, eligibility to compete in U.S. National Team qualifying events and eligibility to participate in national team testing. Membership also includes insurance coverage, help in locating clubs across the nation, access to USRowing's resource library of more than 700 articles, eligibility to attend the USRowing Annual Convention, eligibility to participate in the coaching education program and much more.

USRowing organizational membership offers opportunities to participate in a superior commercial general liability and sports accident insurance policy, access to USRowing's Resource Library, eligibility to participate in USRowing national and regional regattas, discounts on safety equipment, and much more.

== National Teams ==
USRowing's Senior National Team represents the U.S. at the highest level of competition, either at the Olympic Games or the World Championships. While the Summer Olympics are held once every four years, the world championships are held every year. There are 22 world championship's events and only 14 Olympic events. In Olympic years, the Games serve as the world championships for those 14 events, while the other eight events have their own world championships held in conjunction with the Junior World Championships. Athletes on the Senior National Teams are chosen from both a selection camp and trials process, depending on the boat category.

USRowing's Under 23 National Team competes at the World Rowing Under 23 Championships each year. This developmental team has placed numerous athletes on the world championships and Olympic squads. Athletes on the Under 23 squad are chosen from both a selection camp and trials process, depending on the boat category.

USRowing also fields a Junior National Team that competes at the World Rowing Junior Championships each year. Junior national team athletes are chosen from both a selection camp and trials process, depending on the boat category.

== Events ==
USRowing hosts five national championships regattas – USRowing Indoor National Championships, USRowing Summer National Championships, USRowing Summer Youth National Championships, USRowing Youth National Championships and USRowing Masters National Championships.

In addition, USRowing hosts national team selection events for the Senior, Under 23 and Junior National Teams. USRowing also hosts several regional regattas for youth and masters athletes.

In addition, USRowing hosts several national team selection events each year. The National Selection Regattas are the initial step in the senior national team selection process. USRowing also holds National Team Trials to select certain boat categories for the Junior, Under 23 and Senior National Teams.

== Classifications and masters handicaps ==
In the "Rules of Rowing," USRowing sets classifications for competitors by age, skill, and sets handicaps by age for masters rowers.

Classifications by skill include:

- Elite: National Team athletes or medalists at the World Rowing U23 Championships
- Senior: Non-elite rowers who have won in the Intermediate or Senior category at the USRowing National Championships or Royal Canadian Henley Regatta
- Intermediate: Athletes who are not Senior or Elite

USRowing classifications by age are based on the calendar year in which an athlete's birthday occurs for a given category. So for the U19 category, the athlete may compete in the category until December 31 of the year of their 18th birthday. The Rules of Rowing contain categories for U23, U21, U19, U17, and U15. Athletes may compete in "youth" categories until the year they turn 19, or are no longer seeking a secondary school diploma.

After the year in which athletes turn 21, they are considered "masters" athletes. USRowing rules include 11 age-based masters categories and handicaps for each category, representing time that may be subtracted from the crew's finish time. The average age is used for the crew.

== Coaching education ==
USRowing offers three levels of coaching certification, an annual convention and other continuing education opportunities.

The USRowing Coaching Education Certification Program is designed to help coaches get the information they need to run a safe and successful program. The Initiation Level (Level I) is designed for someone who has never coached rowing before, the Foundation Level (Level II) is for a coach with about one year's experience and the Intermediate Level (Level III) is for the new varsity coach or an assistant with five years of experience.

For coaches whose experience goes beyond what is offered in the certification program, USRowing offers the Advanced Coaches Series at the USRowing Annual Convention. This program brings together expert speakers from around the rowing world, as well as other sports-related disciplines.

Continuing education clinics are presentations designed by the USRowing staff and a local host organization. USRowing works with the local host organizations to provide information on topics of their interest. The continuing education clinics are not "certification clinics" but can be used as continuing education credits.
