= International Business Law Consortium =

The International Business Law Consortium (IBLC) is a global affiliation of independent law firms, tax and audit advisors, and related professionals. The network cultivates transnational legal knowledge to promote efficient, effective, and service-oriented professional support for businesses operating internationally.

== History and background ==
The IBLC was founded in 1996 under the auspices of the Center for International Legal Studies (CILS), an Austrian-based non-profit organization. The network was originally created to enable law firms affiliated with CILS to participate in its legal research, education, and development programs.

== Purpose and activities ==
IBLC provides a platform for its members to engage in:

- Cross-border legal collaboration
- Knowledge sharing and peer networking
- Joint professional development initiatives
- International legal education and publications

While not a conventional legal network in structure, IBLC offers its members access to international contacts and resources to better serve global clients. Membership is selective and limited to firms with a strong reputation in their jurisdiction.

== Global presence ==
As of 2025, the IBLC has over 80 active member firms across more than 90 jurisdictions in North and Latin America, Europe, Asia-Pacific, the Middle East, and Africa. It includes more than 3,000 professionals.

Notable member firms include:

- DSM Avocats à la Cour – Luxembourg
- MPR Partners – Romania
- Friedrich Graf von Westphalen & Partner – Germany
- TRIPLET Carat Legal – France
- IPO Pang Shenjun – China
- Cambridge LLP – Canada
- LALIVE SA – Switzerland

== Recognition ==
In the 2025 edition of the Chambers Global Guide, IBLC is ranked Band 2 in the category of Leading Law Firm Networks – Global Market Leaders.

“The International Business Law Consortium (IBLC) is a leading legal network with a presence in established and emerging markets in North and Latin America, Africa, Europe and the Asia-Pacific region. The network has skills in handling major cross-border business matters for its clients, in the areas of tax, M&A and employment in particular. Made up of approximately 3,000 individuals, the network's global capabilities are further strengthened by its connections with other international organisations, including professional services consultancy network IECnet.” — Chambers & Partners, 2025 Global Guide

== Other ==
The IBLC is listed in the Yearbook of International Organizations published by the Union of International Associations (UIA). According to UIA, IBLC promotes independent legal advice, global advocacy, and knowledge-sharing in international legal practice. It is also associated with consultative and observer status at intergovernmental organizations through its relationship with CILS.
