= Lake Washington Rowing Club =

American rowing club

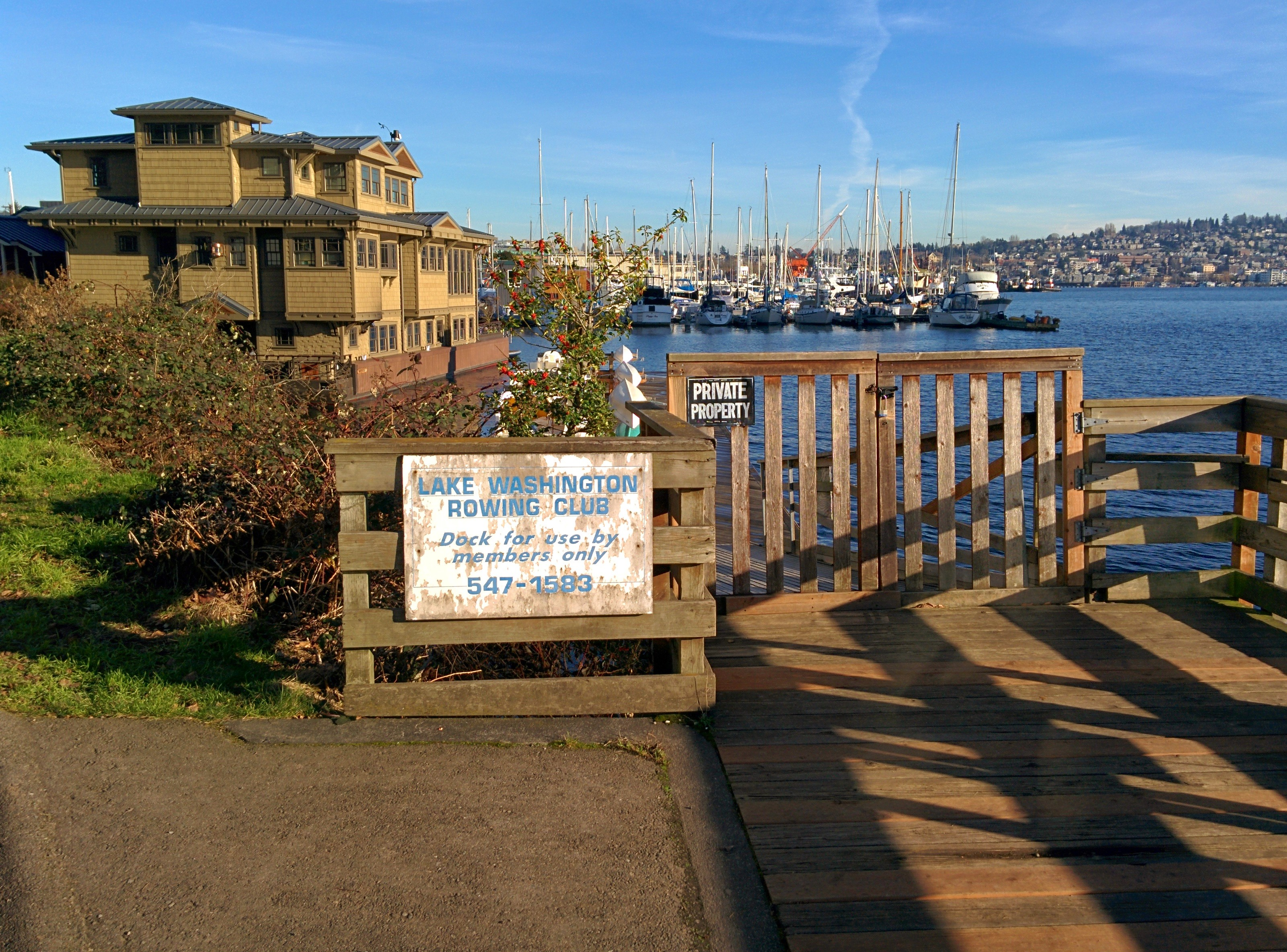
Lake Union, Seattle

Lake Washington Rowing Club (LWRC) is an organization in the greater Seattle area to further the sport of rowing. It trains people ranging in experience from beginners to Olympic-caliber rowers. The club emphasizes mastery of boat-handling skills and values sculling as the principal path to excellence in all types of rowing.

LWRC is the host of the Head of the Lake Regatta, which it has hosted annually in fall since 1979 together with the University of Washington. The regatta is the largest fall regatta on the West Coast of the United States and has seen athletes from all across the country and Canada compete, including several olympic rowers.
