= Ernestine Bayer =

American rower (1909–2006)

Personal information
- Born: Ernestine Steppacher; March 25, 1909 Philadelphia, Pennsylvania, U.S.
- Died: September 10, 2006 (aged 97) Exeter, New Hampshire, U.S.
- Spouse: Ernest Bayer
- Children: 1

Sport
- Sport: Rowing

Ernestine Bayer (born March 25, 1909 – September 10, 2006) was an American rower who has been called the "Mother of Women's Rowing".

== Early life ==
Ernestine Steppacher was born in Philadelphia to Henry and Rosetta Steppacher. As a child she taught herself to ride a bicycle, and took rides on crabbing boats in the Delaware Bay. She later attended secretarial school, and worked as a stenographer in a local bank.

== Rowing career ==
Bayer became interested in rowing through her husband, Ernest Bayer, who became a silver medalist in rowing at the 1928 Olympics. She persuaded him to teach her how to row, despite the disapproval from other male rowers.

In 1938, Bayer co-founded the Philadelphia Girls' Rowing Club (PGRC), and became its first president. The following year, the Schuylkill Navy hosted the first women's race on the Schuykill River, which Bayer and her partner, Jeanette Waetjen Hoover, won.

In 1966, the Women’s Eight from the PGRC won the first National Women’s Rowing Championships. In 1967 Bayer and her 10-woman crew entered the 2nd Women's Rowing Nationals competition; they won all of their events. Bayer pushed for the team (which included her daughter, Tina) to enter the 1967 European women's championships. However, the president of U.S. men's governing body for rowing, John Carlin, was not supportive, fearing the team would be easily beaten by competitors from behind the Iron Curtain. His decision was overruled by the president of the international rowing organization after the team competed successfully in Canada. The team secured a secret loan from Horace Davenport, head of the National Rowing Foundation, to finance their travel, and sourced their own uniforms. Although the American team did not win, they did provide weight to the argument that women's rowing be added to the Summer Olympics.

Following Title IX in 1972, she became a volunteer coach for the women's club at the University of New Hampshire.

Bayer was a member of the U.S. Olympic women's rowing committee for the 1976 Summer Olympics, the first in which women's rowing was included.

In 1989, Bayer rowed in the World Rowing Organization's Masters Regatta that was held in the United States for the first time.

In 1991 she competed in the Florida Masters Regatta and won in a mixed double and the single. Earlier that year she had competed in the Crash B indoor races in Boston and established a world record in her age bracket. In 1992 at age 83, she won her age division, 60 and over, in the Head of the Charles race. She was United States Rowing Sullivan Award nominee that year. At the age of 91 she set the world record on the Concept II rowing ergometer for women over the age of 90. Also that year she competed in the Master's World Championships in Montreal winning the women's double, the women's eight, and taking 2nd in the mixed double.

== Personal life and death ==
Ernestine secretly married Ernest Bayer (d. 1997) on January 28, 1928. Their first date, in 1927, had been at a swimming pool. She gave birth to their daughter, Ernestine, nicknamed Tina, in 1945. The couple moved to New Hampshire in 1971. There, she founded the Alden Ocean Shell Association, an amateur rowing group.

Ernestine suffered her first stroke in March 2003. She recovered enough to be able to row in a double. In July 2005, she had a second stroke which left her paralyzed on her right side and unable to speak.

She died from pneumonia in Exeter, New Hampshire, on September 10, 2006 at the age of 97. She was survived by her daughter, Tina.

== Recognition ==
Beyond her firsts in competition, Bayer was also the first woman to receive several different honors for her rowing career. She received the U.S. Rowing Medal for her contributions to the sport.

In 1980, she became the first woman to be awarded the John J. Carlin service award by the U.S. Rowing Association. In 1984 she became the first woman inducted to the National Rowing Foundation's Hall of Fame.

From 1974 until 2011, the Ernestine Bayer race was held as part of the Head of the Charles race. It was the only race in the event open to recreational shells.
