= List of shipwrecks in 1960 =

The list of shipwrecks in 1960 includes all ships sunk, foundered, grounded, or otherwise lost during 1960.

table of contents
1960
Jan	Feb	Mar	Apr
May	Jun	Jul	Aug
Sep	Oct	Nov	Dec
Unknown date

== January ==
=== 1 January ===
List of shipwrecks: 1 January 1960
Ship	State	Description
Albion	United Kingdom	The Norfolk wherry sank in the River Yare at Cantley. Another wherry sank two miles downstream. Albion was refloated and returned to service.

=== 6 January ===
List of shipwrecks: 6 January 1960
Ship	State	Description
Dogu	Turkey	Stranded at Karaburnu Point, Thessaloniki, Greece.
Uman	Turkey	The cargo ship ran aground at Kefken Point, Turkey. She was on a voyage from Zonguldak to Istanbul. She was declared a constructive total loss.

=== 9 January ===
List of shipwrecks: 9 January 1960
Ship	State	Description
Snjeznik	Yugoslavia	The cargo ship capsized and sank at Suda Bay, Crete. Refloated on 26 March and towed to Piran, Yugoslavia for repairs. Re-entered service in August 1960.

=== 10 January ===
List of shipwrecks: 10 January 1960
Ship	State	Description
Ahern Trader	United Kingdom	The coaster ran aground in Gander Bay. She broke up the next day.

=== 13 January ===
List of shipwrecks: 13 January 1960
Ship	State	Description
Applegarth	United Kingdom	The tug collided with Perthshire in the River Mersey at Birkenhead and sank with the loss of all seven crew.

=== 14 January ===
List of shipwrecks: 14 January 1960
Ship	State	Description
Scarcity	United Kingdom	The coaster was driven ashore at Bawdsey, Suffolk. Three crew taken off by breeches buoy.

=== 18 January ===
List of shipwrecks: 18 January 1960
Ship	State	Description
Sir Edgar	United Kingdom	The cargo ship was lost on this date. Salvaged but consequently scrapped.

=== 20 January ===
List of shipwrecks: 20 January 1960
Ship	State	Description
Bermuda	Netherlands	The coaster capsized and sank 3 nautical miles (5.6 km) off Hook of Holland with the loss of all six crew.
Lieve Vrouwekerk	Netherlands	The Liberty ship ran aground at Vlieland. She was on a voyage from Hamburg, West Germany to Antwerp, Belgium.
Macuto	Panama	The cargo ship broke free from her moorings and rammed three barges and another ship.
Ritornel	Netherlands	The coaster was damaged in a collision with two other ships in the Scheldt.
Vinotra II	Belgium	The barge sank in the Scheldt, both crew killed.

=== 21 January ===
List of shipwrecks: 21 January 1960
Ship	State	Description
Pemex A.	United States	The tanker ran aground in Campeche Bay. She broke in two and sank. She was on a voyage from Campeche to Coatzacoalcos, Mexico. Declared a total loss, both sections were later refloated and scrapped.

=== 30 January ===
List of shipwrecks: 30 January 1960
Ship	State	Description
San Francesco	Italy	The Liberty ship ran aground on Hainan Island. She was later refloated and laid up at Hong Kong.
Unidentified sailboat	Vietnam People's Navy	Vietnam War: The sailboat, being used as a blockade runner, capsized and sank in rough seas off Ly Son Island, South Vietnam. Six crewmen were rescued and made prisoners of war.

=== 31 January ===
List of shipwrecks: 31 January 1960
Ship	State	Description
Fearless	United States	The 145-gross register ton, 90.1-foot (27.5 m) crab-fishing vessel sank in the Gulf of Alaska off Cape Chiniak (57°37′N 152°10′W) on Kodiak Island in Alaska's Kodiak Archipelago with the loss of four lives.

== February ==
=== 3 February ===
List of shipwrecks: 3 February 1960
Ship	State	Description
Carsten Witt	West Germany	The cargo ship sank between Bornholm, Denmark and Sweden. Tanker British Sportsman (United Kingdom) reported to be attempting to rescue survivors.
Filleigh	United Kingdom	The cargo ship collided with a Belgian ship in the Scheldt and ran aground.
Indonor	Panama	The cargo ship ran aground on a reef off Benkoan Island, Indonesia. She was on a voyage from Palembang to Surabaya. She sank four days later.
Llanishen	United Kingdom	The tanker ran aground at the mouth of the Elbe, Hamburg, West Germany.

=== 7 February ===
List of shipwrecks: 7 February 1960
Ship	State	Description
ARA Punta Ciguena	Argentine Navy	The T1 tanker caught fire and sank in the River Uruguay. She was on a voyage from Concepción to Buenos Aires.

=== 13 February ===
List of shipwrecks: 13 February 1960
Ship	State	Description
Leonore	West Germany	The coaster sank off Jutland, Denmark with the loss of all eight crew. HDMS Niels Ebbesen (Royal Danish Navy) recovered two empty lifeboats.

=== 18 February ===
List of shipwrecks: 18 February 1960
Ship	State	Description
Adonis	Honduras	The cargo ship sank 20 miles (32 km) off Otranto, Italy. All twenty crew rescued by Sologne (Marine Nationale).

=== 20 February ===
List of shipwrecks: 20 February 1960
Ship	State	Description
British Valour	United Kingdom	The tanker was in collision with Butmah (France) at Port Said, Egypt.
Harpalion	United Kingdom	The cargo ship ran aground 5 nautical miles (9.3 km) north of Texel, Netherlands. Refloated the next day.

=== 21 February ===
List of shipwrecks: 21 February 1960
Ship	State	Description
Brigadier	United Kingdom	The tug ran aground on Horse Isle, in the Firth of Clyde. She was abandoned as a total loss.

=== 22 February ===
List of shipwrecks: 22 February 1960
Ship	State	Description
Oswego Transporter	Bahamas	The T2 tanker suffered an engine failure in the Pacific Ocean (10°30′S 78°41′W). She was on a voyage from Callao, Peru to Talara, Peru. She was towed in to Callao by the tanker Andromeda (Flag unknown). Oswego Transporter was declared uneconomic to repair and was consequently scrapped.

=== 26 February ===
List of shipwrecks: 26 February 1960
Ship	State	Description
Lieve Vrouwekerk	Netherlands	The Liberty ship was driven ashore on Ameland, Friesland. She was refloated but declared a constructive total loss and scrapped.

=== 27 February ===
List of shipwrecks: 27 February 1960
Ship	State	Description
Fin Fin	United States	The 8-gross register ton, 30.8-foot (9.4 m) fishing vessel sank in Zimovia Strait in the Alexander Archipelago in Southeast Alaska.

== March ==
=== 1 March ===
List of shipwrecks: 1 March 1960
Ship	State	Description
No. 517 Yuanzheng	Republic of China Navy	Chinese Civil War: The auxiliary gunboat was shelled and sunk by No. 565, No. 566, and No. 567 (all People's Liberation Army Navy). 12 crewmen killed, 10 taken as prisoners of war.

=== 4 March ===
List of shipwrecks: 4 March 1960
Ship	State	Description
USCGC General Greene	United States Coast Guard	USCGC General Greene While attempting to assist a tug in distress, the United States Coast Guard cutter — 125-foot (38 m) Active-class patrol boat — was swept ashore on Spring Hill Beach at East Sandwich, Massachusetts, by hurricane-force winds and 40-foot (12 m) waves. All hands were rescued and the ship was refloated on 8 March.
La Coubre	France	The cargo ship exploded in Havana harbor while unloading munitions. 101 people killed and 200 wounded
Sunfish	United Kingdom	The tug collided with Tower Bridge in London and sank with the loss of one of her six crew.

=== 8 March ===
List of shipwrecks: 8 March 1960
Ship	State	Description
Plassy	United Kingdom	MV Plassy, 2005 Wrecked on Finnis Rock, off Inisheer, Aran Islands, Ireland. All eleven crew saved. Wreck later driven ashore, where it remained as of 2005.

=== 13 March ===
List of shipwrecks: 13 March 1960
Ship	State	Description
Dominator	Panama	The Liberty ship ran aground at Palo Verdes Point, California, United States and broke up.

=== 14 March ===
List of shipwrecks: 14 March 1960
Ship	State	Description
Hazel M	United States	The 9-gross register ton 32-foot (9.8 m) fishing vessel was destroyed by fire in Monashka Bay (57°50′N 152°25′W) on the coast of Kodiak Island in Alaska's Kodiak Archipelago.

=== 15 March ===
List of shipwrecks: 15 March 1960
Ship	State	Description
Westbrook	United Kingdom	The tanker ran aground at Newport, Monmouthshire. She was under tow from Barry, Glamorgan to Newport for scrapping. She was refloated and scrapped.

=== 17 March ===
List of shipwrecks: 17 March 1960
Ship	State	Description
Arietta	Greece	Ran aground off Novorossiysk, Soviet Union. Refloated on 1 April but declared a constructive total loss.

=== 21 March ===
List of shipwrecks: 21 March 1960
Ship	State	Description
Walbrook	United Kingdom	The tug capsized and sank at Tilbury, Essex. All six crew rescued.

=== 26 March ===
List of shipwrecks: 26 March 1960
Ship	State	Description
Høegh Spear	Norway	The tanker crashed into a jetty and ran aground at the mouth of the River Tyne at North Shields, United Kingdom. Refloated on 27 March.

=== 27 March ===
List of shipwrecks: 27 March 1960
Ship	State	Description
Saint Christopher	United States	The 11-gross register ton, 29.3-foot (8.9 m) motor vessel was wrecked in Takaze Bay (57°09′N 134°50′W), also known as "Takatz Bay," in Chatham Strait in the Alexander Archipelago in Southeast Alaska.

=== 28 March ===
List of shipwrecks: 28 March 1960
Ship	State	Description
Dai Hatin	Pakistan	The coaster sprang a leak and sank 8 nautical miles (15 km; 9.2 mi) off Karachi, Pakistan, with the loss of ten of her twelve crew.

=== 30 March ===
List of shipwrecks: 30 March 1960
Ship	State	Description
Altamar	Argentina	The cargo ship wrecked in the Atlantic Ocean north of São Luís, Brazil, on Manoel Luis Reef at 00°46′S 044°20′W during a voyage from Cabedelo to Belém, Brazil, with a cargo of grain.

=== Unknown date ===
List of shipwrecks: Unknown date 1960
Ship	State	Description
Surf Pilot	United Kingdom	The Surf-class tanker was sunk as a target off the coast of Malaya in 64 metres (210 ft) of water off Pulau Aur (2°33′N 104°40′E).

== April ==
=== 4 April ===
List of shipwrecks: 4 April 1960
Ship	State	Description
HMS Narwhal	Royal Navy	The Porpoise-class submarine ran aground at the entrance to Campbeltown Loch, Scotland. Refloated the next day.

=== 10 April ===
List of shipwrecks: 10 April 1960
Ship	State	Description
Aleutian I	United States	The 12-gross register ton, 29.5-foot (9.0 m) fishing vessel sank in "King Cove" on the coast of Alaska after striking an unidentified object. The wreck report does not make clear whether she sank at King Cove on the coast of the Alaska Peninsula or in King Cove (58.1946°N 152.0400°W) on the coast of Afognak Island in the Kodiak Archipelago.

=== 11 April ===
List of shipwrecks: 11 April 1960
Ship	State	Description
Ardglen	United Kingdom	The coaster ran aground at Quebec City, Quebec, Canada.

=== 13 April ===
List of shipwrecks: 13 April 1960
Ship	State	Description
Arlanza	United Kingdom	The passenger ship was launched in gale force winds, almost colliding with the entrance to a dock. Two tugs ran aground whilst trying to assist.

=== 16 April ===
List of shipwrecks: 16 April 1960
Ship	State	Description
Ethel C	Panama	The coaster was holed and abandoned off the coast of Virginia, United States. An explosion in her engine room blew her stern off and she sank in the Atlantic Ocean (37°12′N 75°15′W). She was on a voyage from New York, United States to Rotterdam, South Holland, Netherlands.

=== 17 April ===
List of shipwrecks: 17 April 1960
Ship	State	Description
Ethel C	Lebanon	The cargo ship sprang a leak after her cargo of scrap iron shifted. An explosion then occurred at the stern of the ship and she sank off Virginia, United States. All 23 crew rescued by United States Coast Guard vessels.

=== 20 April ===
List of shipwrecks: 20 April 1960
Ship	State	Description
Cape Matapan	South Africa	The 140.1-foot (42.7 m), 321-ton trawler was sunk in a collision with the trawler Bulby (South Africa) 2 miles (3.2 km) off Cape Town, South Africa.

=== 22 April ===
List of shipwrecks: 22 April 1960
Ship	State	Description
Pearl Ann	United States	The 11-gross register ton, 34.7-foot (10.6 m) fishing vessel was destroyed by fire at Cordova, Alaska.

=== 29 April ===
List of shipwrecks: 29 April 1960
Ship	State	Description
Hanne S	Denmark	The coaster was last reported at 58°N 44°W. Wreckage found on 3 May by a Royal Danish Navy corvette. All fifteen crew and three passengers lost.

== May ==
=== 5 May ===
List of shipwrecks: 5 May 1960
Ship	State	Description
Federal Express	Canada	The cargo ship was rammed by Polaris (Sweden) while moored at Montreal. She broke free from her moorings and rammed into Thorshope (Norway) and sank within 30 minutes. Later partly raised and scrapped.

=== 8 May ===
List of shipwrecks: 8 May 1960
Ship	State	Description
Brant	United States	The 100-foot (30.5 m) oil exploration survey vessel burned and sank in 150 feet (46 m) of water in the Pacific Ocean off Point Conception, California, after an engine room fire went out of control. Small vessels in the vicinity rescued her entire crew of eight.

=== 11 May ===
List of shipwrecks: 11 May 1960
Ship	State	Description
Pier Schipper	Netherlands	The coaster sank off the coast of Norfolk, United Kingdom. All crew rescued.

=== 18 May ===
List of shipwrecks: 18 May 1960
Ship	State	Description
Andros Coral	Norway	The Liberty ship ran aground south east of Dona Sebastiana Island, Chile. She was on a voyage from San Juan de la Costa, Chile to Buenos Aires, Argentina. She sank on 20 May and was abandoned as a constructive total loss.

=== 21 May ===
List of shipwrecks: 21 May 1960
Ship	State	Description
Bjørgvin	Norway	The cargo liner was wrecked off Tønsberg.

=== 25 May ===
List of shipwrecks: 25 May 1960
Ship	State	Description
Rican Star	Australia	The fishing trawler was wrecked near Hummocky Island, Queensland, Australia.

== June ==
=== 1 June ===
List of shipwrecks: 1 June 1960
Ship	State	Description
Treworlas	United Kingdom	The cargo ship ran aground on the Madira Reef, in the Persian Gulf. She was refloated on 7 June with the assistance of tugs. Declared a constructive total loss on arrival at Falmouth, Cornwall and consequently scrapped.

=== 9 June ===
List of shipwrecks: 9 June 1960
Ship	State	Description
Malaya Fir	Panama	Typhoon Mary: The cargo ship and coaster Wan Fu (Hong Kong) ended up stranded on the runway at Kai Tak International Airport, Hong Kong.
San Francesco	Italy	Typhoon Mary: The Liberty ship sank at Hong Kong. Subsequently refloated and scrapped.
Shun Lee	Hong Kong	Typhoon Mary: The cargo ship was driven aground against Pratas Island in the South China Sea and was wrecked. Her 55 crew took to the liferafts.
Wan Fu	Hong Kong	Typhoon Mary: The cargo ship Malaya Fir (Panama) and coaster ended up stranded on the runway at Kai Tak International Airport, Hong Kong.

=== 13 June ===
List of shipwrecks: 13 June 1960
Ship	State	Description
James J. Buckler	Canada	The cargo ship ran aground on a sandbank at the mouth of the Saguenay River in Quebec, Canada. She broke in half during refloating attempts on 16 June. Later refloated and scuttled.

=== 14 June ===
List of shipwrecks: 14 June 1960
Ship	State	Description
Iva Ann	United States	The 10-gross register ton, 34.5-foot (10.5 m) fishing vessel sank in Southeast Alaska approximately 40 nautical miles (74 km; 46 mi) south of Ketchikan, Alaska.
Mary-Jo	United States	The 10-gross register ton, 39-foot (11.9 m) fishing vessel was destroyed by fire in Kalinin Bay (57°20′N 135°47′W) on the coast of Kruzof Island in the Alexander Archipelago in Southeast Alaska.

=== 18 June ===
List of shipwrecks: 18 June 1960
Ship	State	Description
Ron Woolaway	United Kingdom	The dredger capsized in the Bristol Channel off Flat Holm. Her seven crew survived. She was subsequently towed to Cardiff, Glamorgan, where she was righted, repaired and returned to service.

=== 19 June ===
List of shipwrecks: 19 June 1960
Ship	State	Description
Indian Enterprise	India	The cargo ship suffered an onboard explosion and sank in the Red Sea 300 nautical miles (560 km) south of Suez, Egypt (25°31′N 35°27′E).
Yan'an	People's Liberation Army Navy	The decommissioned gunboat was sunk in a missile test.

=== 24 June ===
List of shipwrecks: 24 June 1960
Ship	State	Description
LV-78	United States Coast Guard	The lightship, while relieving Ambrose Station, sank after she was rammed at the entrance to New York Harbor, United States, by the steamer Green Bay (United States).

=== 26 June ===
List of shipwrecks: 26 June 1960
Ship	State	Description
R. P. No. 1	United States	The 9-gross register ton, 28.2-foot (8.6 m) fishing vessel sank in Bristol Bay off the coast of Alaska.

=== 27 June ===
List of shipwrecks: 27 June 1960
Ship	State	Description
George MacDonald	United States	The T3 tanker suffered an engine room explosion 160 nautical miles (300 km) east of Savannah, Georgia. She was on a voyage from Houston, Texas to New York. She was taken in tow the next day by the tanker J. E. Dyer (United States) but the tow parted on 29 June. She was abandoned by her crew and sank 47 nautical miles (87 km) off Charleston, South Carolina (32°25′N 78°50′W)

=== 29 June ===
List of shipwrecks: 29 June 1960
Ship	State	Description
Big Dipper	United States	The 13-gross register ton motor vessel sank in Valdez Arm (60°53′N 146°54′W) on the south-central coast of Alaska.

== July ==
=== 7 July ===
List of shipwrecks: 7 July 1960
Ship	State	Description
Munken	Norway	The cargo ship foundered off Lindesnes, Norway.

=== 11 July ===
List of shipwrecks: 11 July 1960
Ship	State	Description
Gladys	United Kingdom	The motor barge sank in the Medway Estuary off the Isle of Grain, Kent following a collision with Kirovograd (Soviet Union).

=== 13 July ===
List of shipwrecks: 13 July 1960
Ship	State	Description
Hero	Australia	The tug foundered at Port Kembla, New South Wales whilst attempting to go to the aid of Bulwarra (United Kingdom), which was being driven against the jetty in a storm.

=== 18 July ===
List of shipwrecks: 18 July 1960
Ship	State	Description
Avalon	United States	The passenger ship was destroyed by fire at Long Beach, California.
Denbigh Coast	United Kingdom	The coaster collided with Irish Maple (Republic of Ireland) and sank 8 nautical miles (15 km) off New Brighton, Cheshire. All ten crew rescued by the dredger Hilbre Island and the Liverpool Pilot Boat (both United Kingdom).

=== 19 July ===
List of shipwrecks: 19 July 1960
Ship	State	Description
Coral Sea	United States	The 148-gross register ton, 96.3-foot (29.4 m) fishing vessel was destroyed by fire in Frederick Sound in the Alexander Archipelago in Southeast Alaska.

=== 24 July ===
List of shipwrecks: 24 July 1960
Ship	State	Description
HMS Northumbria	Royal Navy	The Ton-class minesweeper ran aground at Lindisfarne, Northumberland.

== August ==
=== 2 August ===
List of shipwrecks: 2 August 1960
Ship	State	Description
Pen 30	United States	A storm destroyed the 8-gross register ton 28.6-foot (8.7 m) fishing vessel at Port Moller (59°59′30″N 160°34′30″W), Alaska.

=== 4 August ===
List of shipwrecks: 4 August 1960
Ship	State	Description
HMS Vanguard	Royal Navy	The battleship ran aground at the entrance to Portsmouth Harbour on the coast of England while under tow to the breakers.

=== 5 August ===
List of shipwrecks: 5 August 1960
Ship	State	Description
Lanterna	Italy	The coaster sank 60 nautical miles (110 km) south of Aden with the loss of five of the nine people on board.

=== 6 August ===
List of shipwrecks: 6 August 1960
Ship	State	Description
Pelorus	United Kingdom	The Trinity House pilot cutter ran aground off Dungeness, Kent. Refloated five hours later.

=== 8 August ===
List of shipwrecks: 8 August 1960
Ship	State	Description
Panaghia T.	Liberia	The tanker ran aground 8 nautical miles (15 km) south of Tamandaré, Brazil following an engine room fire. Refloated on 5 September but subsequently scrapped.
Sophoclyve	Liberia	The cargo ship sprang a leak and foundered.

=== 24 August ===
List of shipwrecks: 24 August 1960
Ship	State	Description
Halcyon Med	Lebanon	The cargo ship collided with the tanker Esso Switzerland (Panama) near the Isla de Alborán in the Strait of Gibraltar with the loss of three of her 26 crew. Twenty three survivors were rescued by Esso Switzerland and transferred to USNS General LeRoy Eltinge ( United States Naval Service) and landed at Gibraltar. Halcyon Med was cut in two; The stern section sank (approx 36°09′N 3°36′W). The bow section was taken in tow, but it also sank (36°26′N 3°20′W). She was on a voyage from Arzew, Algeria to Granton, Lothian, United Kingdom.

=== 2 August ===
List of shipwrecks: 2 August 1960
Ship	State	Description
World Sky	Greece	Six of crew dead 10 missing. Wreck off the coast of Oman.

== September ==
=== 2 September ===
List of shipwrecks: 2 September 1960
Ship	State	Description
A T B No. 41	United States	The 389-gross register ton, 119.8-foot (36.5 m) scow was wrecked on Ocean Cape Beach (59°32′30″N 139°51′30″W) on the south-central coast of Alaska.
Pelican	United States	The 12-gross register ton, 37.4-foot (11.4 m) fishing vessel sank at Kodiak, Alaska.

=== 3 September ===
List of shipwrecks: 3 September
Ship	State	Description
Kalamas	Greece	The Liberty ship was driven ashore near Cape Arago, Oregon, United States. She was later refloated and towed to Coos Bay. Declared a constructive total loss.

=== 7 September ===
List of shipwrecks: 7 September 1960
Ship	State	Description
Theo E	United States	The 72-gross register ton, 68.2-foot (20.8 m) fishing vessel sank at Yakutat, Alaska.
Tom	United States	The 36-gross register ton, 50.8-foot (15.5 m) tug sank in 492 feet (150 m) of water in Stephens Passage near Frederick Sound in the Alexander Archipelago in Southeast Alaska with the loss of two lives.

=== 8 September ===
List of shipwrecks: 8 September 1960
Ship	State	Description
It	United States	The 8-gross register ton 33.7-foot (10.3 m) fishing vessel sank at Juneau, Alaska.

=== 14 September ===
List of shipwrecks: 14 September 1960
Ship	State	Description
Ithaka	Greece	Ithaka. The bulk ore carrier lost her rudder and both anchors in a gale and was stranded in Hudson Bay, Canada 10 nautical miles (19 km) east of Churchill, Manitoba (58°46′42″N 93°53′24″W). Crew rescued by CGS Sir William Alexander (Canada) and landed at Winnipeg, Manitoba on 18 September.

=== 17 September ===
List of shipwrecks: 17 September 1960
Ship	State	Description
Mar Feliz	Hong Kong	The cargo ship ran aground in the Straat Kidjang, off the coast of Indonesia. She was refloated and put in to Singapore. Consequently scrapped.

=== 29 September ===
List of shipwrecks: 29 September 1960
Ship	State	Description
Bonanza	United States	The 38-gross register ton, 52.4-foot (16.0 m) fishing vessel sank after striking a reef at Nagai Rock (55°49′30″N 155°46′00″W) near Chirikof Island in the Gulf of Alaska.

=== Unknown date ===
List of shipwrecks: Unknown date 1960
Ship	State	Description
Texita	Liberia	The cargo ship ran aground off Plumb Point, Jamaica.

== October ==
=== 2 October ===
List of shipwrecks: 2 October 1960
Ship	State	Description
Sheikh	Greece	The cargo ship was driven ashore in a typhoon at Kitadaitō, Japan and broke in two.

=== 4 October ===
List of shipwrecks: 4 October 1960
Ship	State	Description
Valdes	United Kingdom	The cargo ship was driven ashore at Palamós, Catalonia, Spain in a storm.

=== 7 October ===
List of shipwrecks: 7 October 1960
Ship	State	Description
Tina Scarlett	Denmark	and Diamant (Netherlands): The ferry and tanker collided in the Rhine at Emmerich, West Germany. Diamant's cargo of petrol caught fire, engulfing both ships. The coaster Vaarwell II (Netherlands) and tanker Brigitte (West Germany) were also engulfed by flames and sank. Two people were killed. A number of other vessels were damaged; including Cabato, Emilia, Liberté, Spido, Vinkeveen and Virgo Fidelis II (all Netherlands); Bellinzona Basel (Switzerland)

=== 8 October ===
List of shipwrecks: 8 October 1960
Ship	State	Description
Locheil	United Kingdom	The mailboat ran aground in Escart Bay, West Loch Tarbert and was holed. Her cargo of mail and all 150 passengers were transferred to Lochfyne (United Kingdom). Several sheep were thrown overboard and swam ashore without loss.
Orion	United States	The 23-gross register ton, 42.9-foot (13.1 m) fishing vessel disappeared in Southeast Alaska during a voyage from Hydaburg to Ketchikan, Alaska.

=== 11 October ===
List of shipwrecks: 11 October 1960
Ship	State	Description
HMAS Woomera	Royal Australian Navy	The naval auxiliary ship was dumping ammunition at sea when there was an explosion and fire. She capsized and sank 23 nautical miles (43 km) off Sydney with the loss of two of her crew.

=== 22 October ===
List of shipwrecks: 22 October 1960
Ship	State	Description
Alcoa Corsair	United States	The Victory ship collided with the cargo ship Lorenzo Marcello in the Mississippi River at Empire, Louisiana with the loss of ten lives. Alcoa Corsair was on a voyage from Houston, Texas to Bombay, India.
Argo Delos	Greece	The cargo ship ran aground on Tor Rocks, Northern Ireland and was wrecked. All 33 crew rescued by helicopter and transferred to HMS Leopard (Royal Navy).
Humbergate	United Kingdom	The coaster ran aground 5 nautical miles (9.3 km) north of Spurn Point, Yorkshire. Refloated on 24 October.

=== 24 October ===
List of shipwrecks: 24 October 1960
Ship	State	Description
Ajoy	India	The dredger collided with one of the Renfrew ferries and sank in the Clyde. Later refloated, repaired and returned to service.
El Gamil	United Arab Republic	The cargo ship sank 45 nautical miles (83 km) south of Kamaran, Aden. Twenty three crew killed, one survivor was rescued by Strathnaver (United Kingdom).
Friso	Netherlands	The coaster capsized and sank off Jutland, Denmark.

=== 25 October ===
List of shipwrecks: 25 October 1960
Ship	State	Description
Arkendale H and Wastdale H	United Kingdom	Arkendale H and Wastdale H, July 2011 The barges collided with the Severn Railway Bridge, bringing down two spans. Both vessels caught fire and were grounded near the main channel. The wreckage of both vessels is in situ as of July 2011.

=== 26 October ===
List of shipwrecks: 26 October 1960
Ship	State	Description
Harpula	United Kingdom	The tanker ran aground off Plumb Point Lighthouse, Jamaica.

=== 31 October ===
List of shipwrecks: 31 October 1960
Ship	State	Description
Clan Alpine	United Kingdom	The cargo ship was driven 11 miles (18 km) up the Karnaphuli River in a cyclone and stranded. Declared a constructive total loss, she was scrapped in situ in February 1961.
Lesrix	United Kingdom	Foundered off the Isle of Wight on a voyage from Goole, Yorkshire to Hayle, Cornwall.
Southern Venture	Panama	The cargo ship was driven ashore in the Karnaphuli River in a cyclone. She was refloated on 15 November. Subsequently repaired and returned to service.
Veravia	United Kingdom	The coaster sank in the English Channel off Le Havre, France. All three crew rescued by Karl Grammerstorf (West Germany) and landed at Le Havre.

=== Unknown date ===
List of shipwrecks: Unknown date 1960
Ship	State	Description
Streatham Hill	United Kingdom	The cargo ship ran aground in the Oder. Refloated on 10 October.

== November ==
=== 6 November ===
List of shipwrecks: 6 November 1960
Ship	State	Description
Fortuna II	Sweden	The sailing ship sank in the Baltic Sea off Gotland. All four crew rescued by Gunda (West Germany).

=== 9 November ===
List of shipwrecks: 9 November 1960
Ship	State	Description
Colonsay	United Kingdom	The VIC-type lighter ran aground and sank at Barra, Outer Hebrides.

=== 15 November ===
List of shipwrecks: 15 November 1960
Ship	State	Description
Lummi	USA	The 60 GRT former USCG lighthouse tender Alder (WAGL-216) foundered at sea off Baja California.

=== 28 November ===
List of shipwrecks: 28 November 1960
Ship	State	Description
Penteli II	Greece	The cargo ship ran aground at Porkkala, Finland.
Royal Arrow	United Kingdom	The tanker ran aground at Skagen, Denmark.

=== 29 November ===
List of shipwrecks: 29 November 1960
Ship	State	Description
Francisco Morazan	Liberia	The wreck of Francisco Morazan as it appeared on 11 July 2013. The cargo ship ran aground in Lake Michigan at South Manitou Island, Michigan, United States. She was on a voyage from Chicago, Illinois, United States to Hamburg, West Germany She was declared a constructive total loss. Her wreck still survives.

=== Unknown date ===
List of shipwrecks: Unknown date 1960
Ship	State	Description
James J. Buckler	Canada	The cargo ship was scuttled near Les Bergeronnes, Quebec, Canada.
USS Tinosa	United States Navy	The Gato-class submarine was scuttled in the Pacific Ocean off Hawaii.

== December ==
=== 1 December ===
List of shipwrecks: 6 December 1960
Ship	State	Description
Pine Ridge	United States	The T2 tanker broke in two in the Atlantic Ocean 100 nautical miles (190 km) east of Cape Hatteras, North Carolina. The bow section capsized and sank. She was on a voyage from New York to Corpus Christi, Texas. Subsequently rebuilt with bow section from Redstone (United States).

=== 6 December ===
List of shipwrecks: 6 December 1960
Ship	State	Description
Nagato Maru	Japan	The cargo ship was driven ashore at Famagusta, Cyprus in a gale. She was refloated on 9 December and towed to Piraeus, Greece for repairs.
Snjeznik	Yugoslavia	The cargo ship was driven ashore at Famagusta in a gale. She was refloated on 29 April 1961 and anchored whilst minor repairs carried out. Declared a constructive total loss, she departed under tow on 31 August for Genoa, Italy. Sold and repaired, renamed Maha.

=== 7 December ===
List of shipwrecks: 7 December 1960
Ship	State	Description
Tasco	Norway	The cargo ship ran aground near Helsingor, Denmark in a snowstorm.

=== 8 December ===
List of shipwrecks: 8 December 1960
Ship	State	Description
Grief	West Germany	The coaster collided with Kina (Denmark) and sank off Bremerhaven. All 13 crew rescued by a customs boat.
Havlide	Norway	The tanker caught fire 150 nautical miles (280 km) off Malta. The Admiralty tug Mediator (United Kingdom) was despatched to her aid.

=== 12 December ===
List of shipwrecks: 12 December 1960
Ship	State	Description
Heinrich Brand	West Germany	The coaster ran aground in the Gulf of Bothnia. All five crew rescued by helicopter.
Skeldervik	Sweden	The coaster sank in the Baltic Sea off Denmark. All four crew rescued by a Norwegian ship.

=== 14 December ===
List of shipwrecks: 14 December 1960
Ship	State	Description
Peter Zoranic	Yugoslavia	The tanker collided with World Harmony (Greece) in the Bosporus off Beykoz, Turkey and both ships caught fire. They drifted onto Tarsus (Turkey) setting that ship on fire. All three ships were wrecked. A total of 47 crew from the three ships were killed and about 40 were injured.

=== 16 December ===
List of shipwrecks: 16 December 1960
Ship	State	Description
National Trader	Liberia	The Liberty ship caught fire off Cuba and was abandoned. She was subsequently towed to Mobile, Alabama, United States where she was declared a constructive total loss.

=== 21 December ===
List of shipwrecks: 21 December 1960
Ship	State	Description
American Importer	United States	The cargo ship collided with Frithiod (Sweden) in the Elbe.
Elorrio	Spain	The cargo ship foundered on a voyage from Santander to Valencia with the loss of over 20 crew.
Pine Ridge	United States	The T2 tanker broke in two 90 nautical miles (170 km) east of Cape Hatteras, North Carolina (35°11′N 73°35′W). The bow section sank. USS Valley Forge (United States Navy) and Artemis (Norway) went to her assistance. The stern section was towed in to Newport News, Virginia. Although declared a constructive total loss, she was repaired using sections from the tanker Redstone and the T3 tanker Sachem (both United States). She entered service as Meadowbrook in late 1962.
San Gaspar	United Kingdom	The tanker collided with Alvenus (Panama) in the Meuse (Dutch: Maas) at Rotterdam, Netherlands.

=== 28 December ===
List of shipwrecks: 28 December 1960
Ship	State	Description
Pacific No. 1	United States	The 3,238-gross register ton, 272.1-foot (82.9 m) tanker barge was wrecked at Icy Bay on the coast of Alaska.

=== 30 December ===
List of shipwrecks: 6 December 1960
Ship	State	Description
Texmar	United States	The Liberty ship ran aground at Grays Harbor, Washington and broke in two.

=== 31 December ===
List of shipwrecks: 31 December 1960
Ship	State	Description
Indian Navigator	India	The Victory ship caught fire 60 nautical miles (110 km) off the Isles of Scilly, United Kingdom and was abandoned.

== Unknown date ==
List of shipwrecks: Unknown date 1960
Ship	State	Description
HMS Anchorite	Royal Navy	The Amphion-class submarine hit an uncharted rock in the Hauraki Gulf off Auckland, New Zealand, at 36°26′S 175°8′E. The rock subsequently was named Anchorite Rock.
B D and M	United States	The 13-ton, 35-foot (10.7 m) wooden gasoline-powered screw fishing vessel was wrecked opposite Sunny Point Cannery on Gravina Island, Ketchikan, Alaska.
Provornyy	Soviet Navy	The accommodation ship burned and sank at her moorings.
