= SS Christopher Columbus =

US Great Lakes excursion liner (1893–1933)

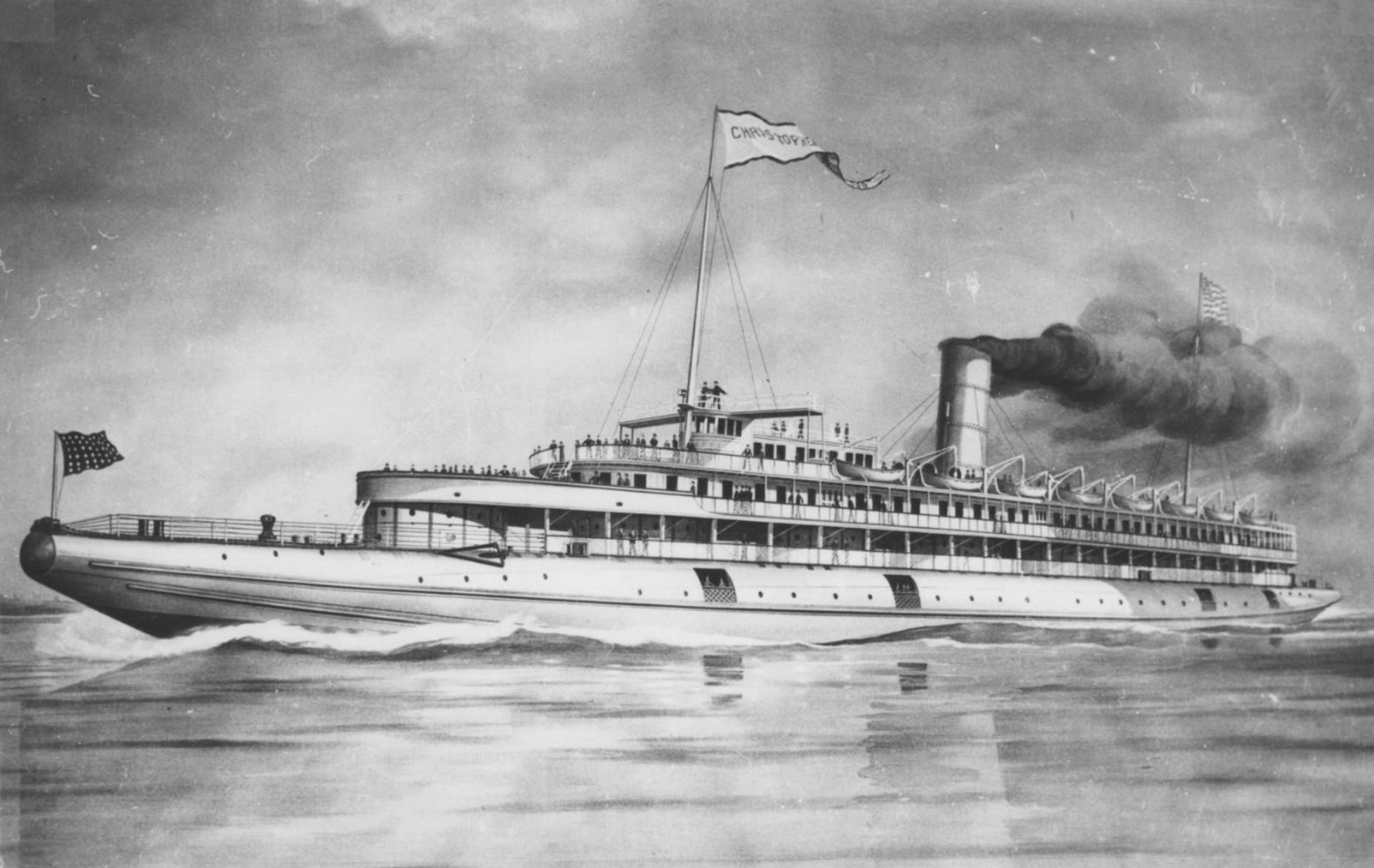
- A painting by Great Lakes marine artist Howard Sprague showing the ship in white livery, as SS Christopher Columbus appeared in 1893.

History

United States
- Name: SS Christopher Columbus
- Owner: Columbian Whaleback Steamship Company (1893–1906); Milwaukee & Chicago Transportation Co. (1906–1909); Goodrich Transit Co. (1909–1933); William F. Price (1933–1934); Chriscarala Corp. (1934–1936)
- Builder: American Steel Barge Company
- Yard number: 00128
- Laid down: September 13, 1892
- Launched: December 3, 1892
- Christened: May 13, 1893
- Out of service: 1933
- Home port: Chicago, Illinois
- Fate: scrapped 1936

General characteristics
- Tonnage: 1,511 GRT (4,279 m^{3})
- Length: 362 ft (110 m)
- Beam: 42 ft (13 m)
- Depth: 24 ft (7 m)
- Propulsion: Six boilers powering two reciprocating triple expansion steam engines, single screw
- Speed: 17 knots (20 mph; 31 km/h)
- Capacity: 5,000 passengers
- Notes: Only passenger whaleback ever built

The SS Christopher Columbus was an American excursion liner on the Great Lakes, in service between 1893 and 1933. She was the only whaleback ship ever built for passenger service. The ship was designed by Alexander McDougall, the developer and promoter of the whaleback design.

Columbus was built between 1892 and 1893 at Superior, Wisconsin, by the American Steel Barge Company. Initially, she ferried passengers to and from the World's Columbian Exposition. Later, she provided general transportation and excursion services to various ports around the lakes.

At 362 feet (110 m), the ship was the longest whaleback ever built, and reportedly also the largest vessel on the Great Lakes when she was launched. Columbus is said to have carried more passengers during her career than any other vessel on the Great Lakes. After a career lasting four decades, she was retired during the Great Depression and scrapped in 1936 by the Manitowoc Shipbuilding Company at Manitowoc, Wisconsin.

== Background and proposal ==
The history of the Columbus is linked with that of the whalebacks, an innovative but not widely accepted ship design of the late 1880s, and of their designer, Alexander McDougall. A Scottish immigrant, Great Lakes captain, inventor and entrepreneur, McDougall developed the idea of the whaleback as a way to improve the ability of barges to follow a towing vessel in heavy seas. Whalebacks were characterized by distinctive hull shapes with rounded tops, lacking conventional vertical sides. Waves thus broke across their hulls with considerably less force than when striking a conventional hull. Water could also flow around the rounded turrets which resembled gun turrets on contemporary warships; the superstructure and deckhouses were mounted on these turrets. The rounded contours of whalebacks gave them an unconventional appearance, and McDougall's ship and barge designs were received with considerable skepticism, resistance, and derision. As they had porcine-looking snouts for bows, some observers called them "pig boats".

After McDougall was unable to persuade existing shipbuilders to try his designs, he founded the American Steel Barge Company in Superior, Wisconsin in 1888, and built them himself. McDougall actively promoted his design and company by sending the SS Charles W. Wetmore to London, and starting another shipyard in Everett, Washington, which built the SS City of Everett. When the 1893 World's Columbian Exposition, to be held in Chicago, Illinois, was in the planning stages, McDougall recognized another opportunity to publicize his design. The Columbus, conceived as an elaborate ferry, was intended to demonstrate that the whaleback design would work well in passenger service, and would be able to travel at high speed. The ship's name honored the explorer Christopher Columbus as did the World's Columbian Exposition itself, timed to coincide with the 400th anniversary of his first voyage to the New World.

== Construction and Columbian Exposition ==
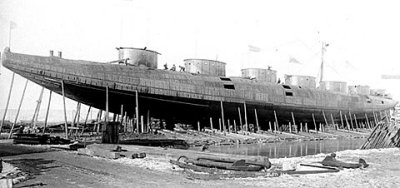
Hull under construction, showing turrets on which the decks were placed

The World's Fair Steamship Company ordered the construction of the Columbus at an estimated cost of US$360,000. The job was undertaken at McDougall's American Steel Barge Company works in Superior, Wisconsin, starting in the fall of 1892.

The hull framing, which included nine bulkheads, was completed on September 13, 1892. The ship's propulsion mechanisms were next installed, consisting of a single four-bladed, 14-foot (4 m) diameter, 19-foot (6 m) pitch propeller, the two reciprocating triple-expansion steam engines (with three cylinders of 26-inch (66 cm), 42-inch (107 cm) and 70-inch (178 cm) diameters in a common frame with a 42-inch (107 cm) stroke) manufactured by Samuel F. Hodge & Co. of Detroit, Michigan, and six steel tubular return Scotch boilers, (11-foot (3 m) diameter by 12-foot (4 m) long), built by Cleveland Shipbuilding Company. The rounded hull top was then added, followed by the six turrets, which were substantially larger than those employed on freighter whalebacks. The ship was launched on December 3, 1892, after which two superstructure decks were mounted on the turrets along the centerline of her hull to afford access to her two internal decks, one in the turrets and one in the hull below.

She was fitted out over the remainder of late 1892 and early 1893. Electric lighting was used, and she was elegantly furnished. Her grand saloon and skylighted promenade deck contained several fountains and a large aquarium filled with trout and other fish of the lakes. The cabins and public spaces were fitted out with oak paneling, velvet carpets, etched glass windows, leather furniture and marble. Shops and restaurants were provided for the passengers.

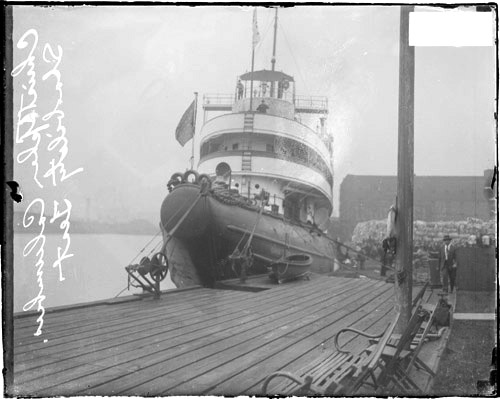
Moored at Rush Street Bridge on Chicago River

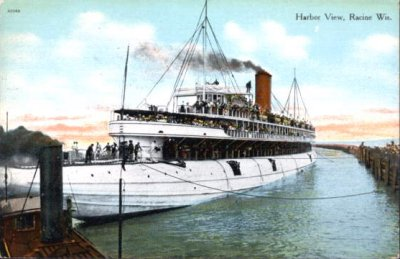
White livery

McDougall's American Steel Barge Company had committed in the contract that the Columbus would be built and delivered in three months, making her one of the fastest-built large ships of her time. The builders further promised rapid loading and unloading, predicting that the vessel would be able to embark 5,000 passengers in five minutes, and disembark the same passengers in even less time. The Columbus was specified to be able run the 6 miles (10 km) from the dock downtown to the fairgrounds at Jackson Park and 64th Street in 20 minutes.

McDougall set up another holding company, the Columbian Whaleback Steamship Company of Duluth, Minnesota, to own and operate the Columbus. She was commissioned on May 13, 1893. Her first captain was John McArthur, who had captained other whalebacks for McDougall's firms, starting with the first powered whaleback, the Colgate Hoyt, built in 1890. McDougall was quoted as having said to McArthur, "There is your steamboat; take her down to Chicago and make a success of her."

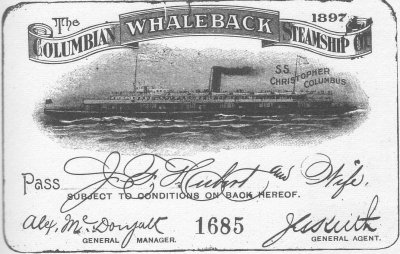
A printed pass, signed by General Manager Alex McDougall

McArthur did just that. Painted in all white livery, the Columbus made multiple round trips per day, sailing along the Lake Michigan shoreline from the Randolph Street/Van Buren Street dock to the Jackson Park site of the World's Columbian Exposition's Beaux arts "White City" exposition fairgrounds. A contemporary souvenir booklet called her "the greatest marine wonder of its time", and another publication dubbed her the "Queen of the Lakes". She had an estimated capacity of 4,000–5,000 passengers on her four decks, but it was reported that she carried 7,000 on her maiden voyage. The Goodrich Transit Line steamer Virginia (later the USS Blue Ridge) is said to have raced against her.

The Columbus carried between 1.7 and 2.0 million passengers (sources differ) during the exposition, with only one fatality, a crew member. In recognition of that success, the commissioners of the exposition presented Captain McArthur with a gold watch engraved with a representation of the ship. McArthur went on to captain other whalebacks including the Frank Rockefeller, which became the SS Meteor, the only whaleback surviving today.

== Regular service ==
Day trip advertisement, 1920s

After the exposition ended the Columbus entered passenger service, and an additional deck (third superstructure, fifth total) was added during the 1899–1900 winter season. Despite the Columbus' success at the exposition, and McDougall's promotional efforts, the whaleback design never caught on. By 1900, the last whalebacks had been built in Superior: the Alexander McDougall in 1899 (the last powered ship), and the John Smeaton, the last whaleback barge. The American Steel Barge Company was sold to the American Ship Building Company, becoming their Superior Works, and switched to more conventional laker designs.

In 1899 the Columbus was leased to and operated by the Goodrich Transit Line, whose steamer Virginia had been a perennial racing rival. She changed hands in 1905 to the Milwaukee & Chicago Transportation company – possibly a Goodrich holding company – and again in 1909 to Goodrich Transit Line. Her livery was at some point between 1906 and 1909 changed to a black hull with yellow accents, and she was placed in service on the route between Chicago and Milwaukee, Wisconsin. The Columbus remained with the Goodrich line for several years. Although she was used for excursions elsewhere around the Great Lakes, her regular schedule was a daily trip to Milwaukee, leaving Chicago mid-morning, sailing to Milwaukee for a two-hour stopover, and then returning (see advertisement right). She made daily round-trip excursions from the Goodrich docks at the Rush Street Bridge.

Columbus had at least three accidents. In June 1895 she suffered an explosion caused by a steam pipe becoming disconnected while she was underway. Accounts differ, but some claim that this happened during a race with her rival, Virginia. In July 1905, she collided with the schooner Ralph Campbell in the Chicago River. On June 30, 1917, she was involved in her most serious accident, a collision with a water tower. The collision happened in Milwaukee while she was being maneuvered by tugs away from her dock. The Milwaukee River current caught her, spinning her sideways, and her bow sheared off two legs of the Yahr-Lang Drug Company's water tower, toppling it and flooding Columbus' decks with about 25,000 US gallons (95,000 L). The collision killed 16 passengers and severely damaged her pilot house, putting her out of service for the rest of the year.

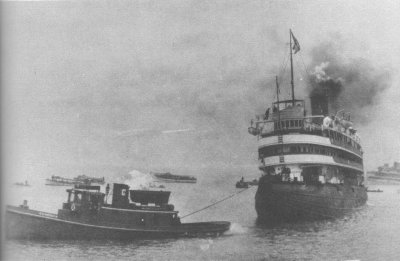
Stability testing

The Columbus was one of the first ships to be fitted with an on-board radio, installed by 1909, when she was allocated the call letters "KC". Columbus and the SS Chicago used radio to help coordinate the rescue of over 200 passengers from the Goodrich liner City of Racine when the Racine was disabled off Waukegan, Illinois, in Lake Michigan.

In 1915, the SS Eastland capsized while docked in the Chicago River, with the loss of 844 lives. Officials subsequently ordered many passenger ships to undergo stability testing, which the Columbus passed easily. Even with 7,500 sandbags (simulating passengers) piled on one side, and tugboats pulling in that direction, she listed only 12 degrees. Columbus was featured at the Century of Progress exhibition in Chicago in 1932–33.

== Disposition ==
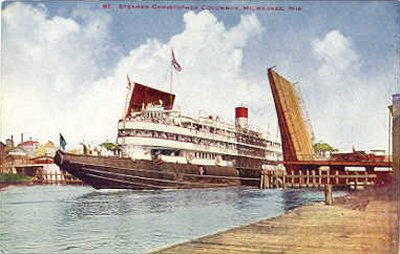
Passing under a lift bridge in Milwaukee, Wisconsin, circa 1909

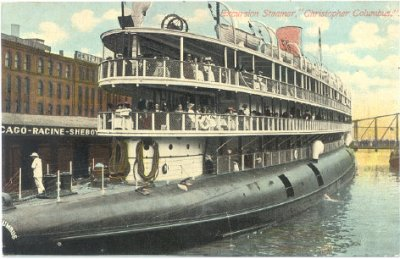
Stern view at the Goodrich docks, Chicago, Illinois

The Columbus was taken out of service in 1933, and changed hands twice during the Great Depression, in 1933 and again in 1934. She was scrapped in 1936 at the Manitowoc Shipbuilding Company in Manitowoc, Wisconsin.

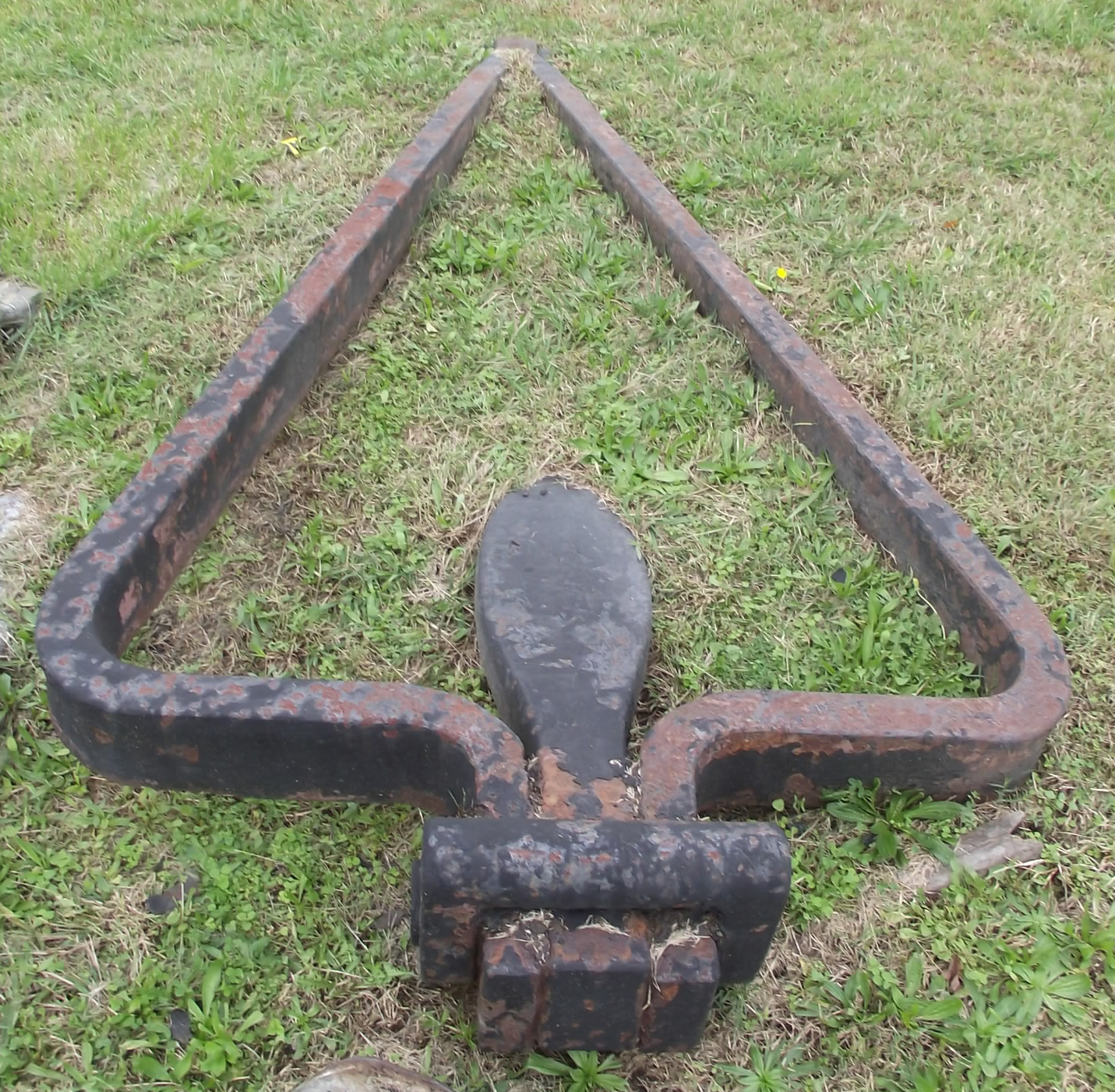
McDougall anchor from SS Christopher Columbus at the Mariners' Museum

SS Christopher Columbus carried 1.7–2 million passengers in her first year alone, and is estimated to have carried more passengers than any other vessel on the Great Lakes. She was one of the most photographed passenger ships on the lakes, and souvenir postcards of her are still widely available. One of her anchors, the design of which was patented by McDougall on February 3, 1891, is displayed at the Mariners' Museum in Newport News, Virginia.
