= A357 =

A357 may refer to:

- A357 road (Great Britain), a main road in Great Britain
- RFA Surf Patrol (A357), a British fleet auxiliary vessel
