= A365 =

A365 may refer to:

- A365 road (Great Britain), a main road in Great Britain
- RFA Surf Pioneer (A365), a British fleet auxiliary vessel
