= Thomas Wilson (shipwreck) =

Whaleback freighter that sank in Lake Superior

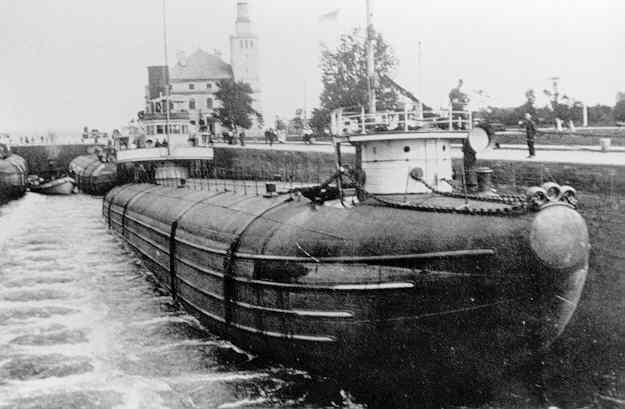
- Thomas Wilson in Soo Locks with two consort barges

History
- Name: Thomas Wilson
- Builder: Alexander McDougall; American Steel Barge Company
- Yard number: Hull No. 119
- Laid down: November 7, 1891
- Launched: April 30, 1892
- In service: 1892–1902
- Fate: Sunk in a collision with George Hadley

General characteristics
- Class & type: Whaleback freighter
- Tonnage: 1,713 GRT; 1,318 NRT
- Length: 308 ft (94 m)
- Beam: 38 ft (12 m)
- Draft: 24 ft (7.3 m)
- Propulsion: Two Scotch boilers, 160 psi (1,100 kPa), One triple-expansion steam engine powering one propeller
- Thomas Wilson (Whaleback Freighter) Shipwreck
- U.S. National Register of Historic Places
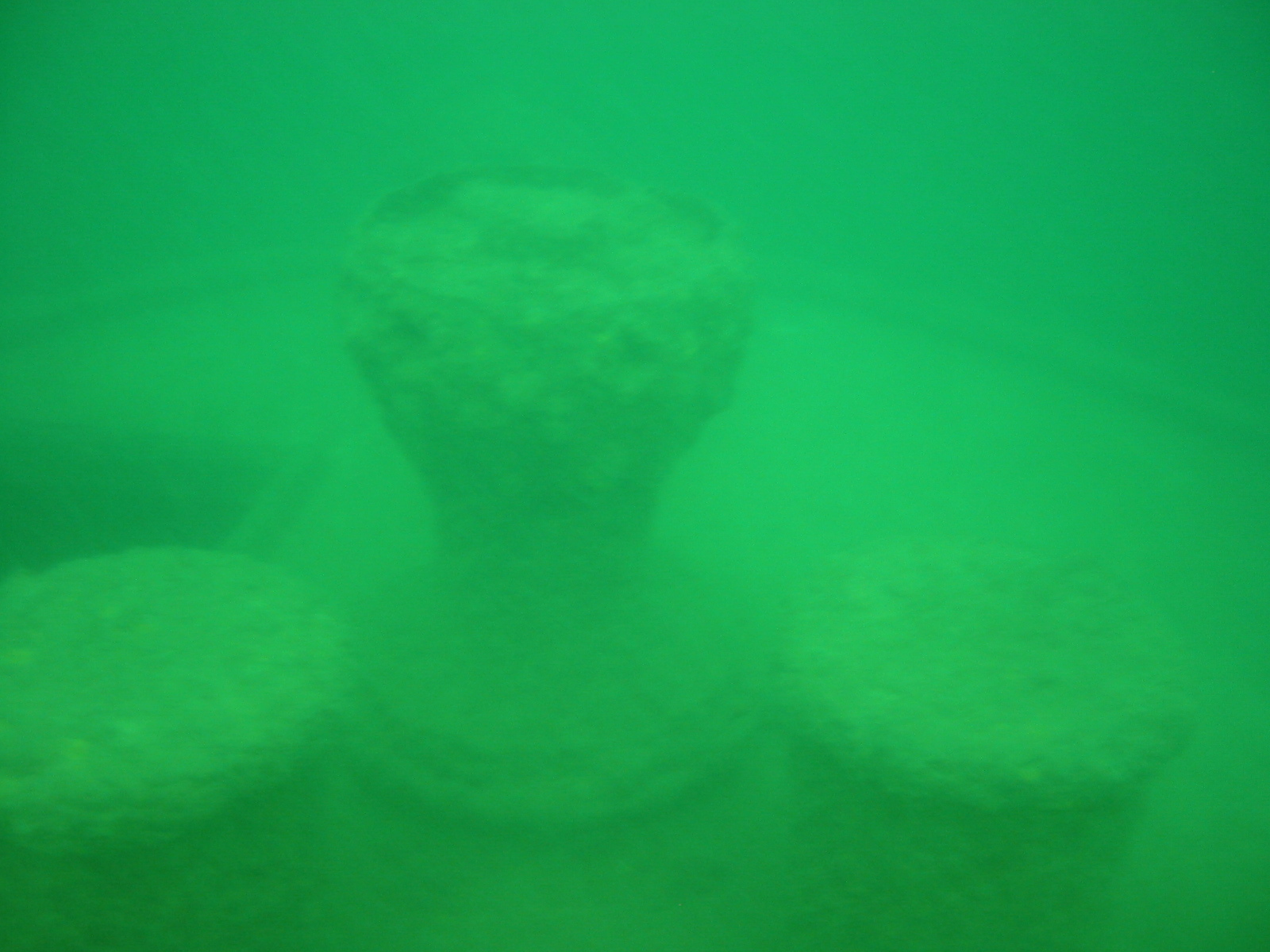
- Capstan and bits on the stern end of the cabin deck

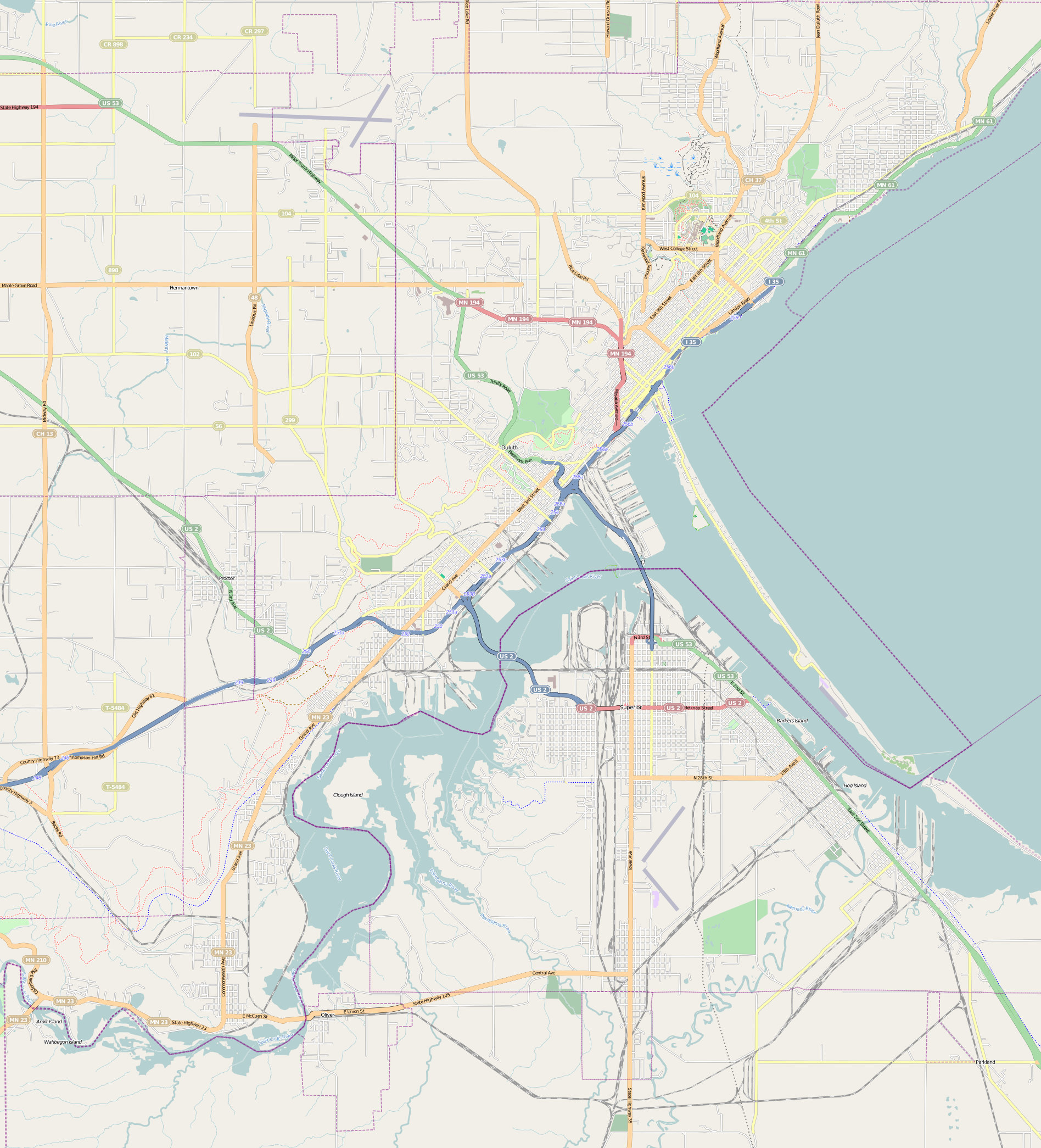
- Location within Duluth Location within Minnesota Location within the United States
- Location: 7/8 of a mile outside the Duluth Harbor entrance, Duluth, Minnesota
- Coordinates: 46°47′0″N 92°4′10″W
- MPS: Minnesota's Lake Superior Shipwrecks MPS
- NRHP reference No.: 92000844
- Added to NRHP: July 23, 1992

Thomas Wilson was a whaleback freighter built in 1892 and used to haul bulk freight on the Great Lakes. The ship sank in Lake Superior just outside the harbor of Duluth, Minnesota, United States, on 7 June 1902, after a collision with the George Hadley. The wreck of the Thomas Wilson is one of the best remaining examples of a whaleback steamer, and it is also significant for the changes made in operating procedures at the Duluth harbor. The remains of the ship were listed on the National Register of Historic Places in 1992.

== Ship ==
The whaleback was designed by Captain Alexander McDougall to carry cargoes of iron ore or grain economically around the Great Lakes. A pair of coal-fired Scotch boiler engines provided steam for the three-cylinder, triple expansion steam engine which drove a single screw propeller. The hull was built of heavy steel plates double-riveted to steel angle frames. The bow and stern were of a conoidal shape, with the center part of the hull being roughly cigar-shaped. The ship was 308 feet (94 m) long, with a 38-foot (12 m) beam and a 24-foot-deep (7 m) hold. The hatches on the deck had no coamings, vertical sections that would have prevented water from coming into the hatches. Instead the hatches were designed to be flush with the surface of the deck, and were simply bolted to the deck.

== Sinking ==
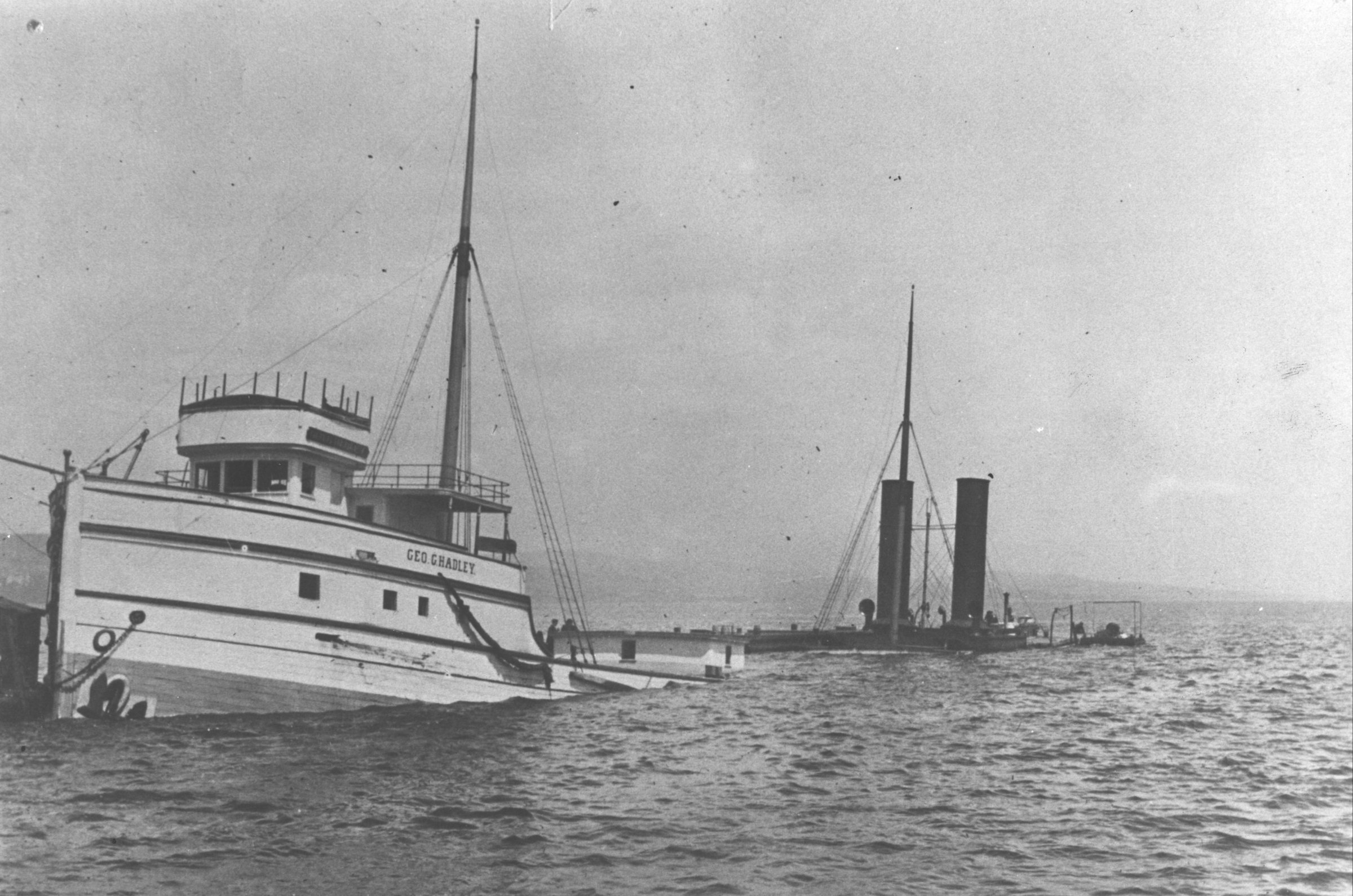
The Hadley after the collision

On 7 June 1902, the Thomas Wilson left the Duluth harbor carrying a load of Mesabi iron ore. The hatches were not yet closed, because the weather was clear and calm. Meanwhile, the George Hadley, a 2,073-ton wooden steamer, was inbound for the Duluth harbor. The tugboat Annie L. Smith directed the George Hadley to divert to the Superior harbor, since all of the Duluth coal docks were full. The captain of the George Hadley ordered an immediate turn to port without noticing the direction of the Thomas Wilson or blowing the required whistle signals. The captain of the Thomas Wilson, concerned about the movements of the George Hadley but suspicious of running aground if he turned to port, ordered an immediate turn to starboard. The George Hadley struck the Thomas Wilson just forward of the aft hatch and recoiled from the collision. The Thomas Wilson rolled over to port, then righted itself and began to sink by the bow. Within three minutes, the entire ship had sunk, drowning nine of the twenty-man crew. The ship and its cargo were valued at $207,000 (equivalent to $7,702,788 in 2025).

As a result of the collision, new rules were instituted in the Duluth harbor:

1. Ships cannot leave the harbor with open hatches.
2. Ships may not pull out from another ship following a collision.
3. Pilots may not carry out any order given by the captain when another vessel is sighted without first calling the captain's attention to the other vessel.
4. All ships must be equipped with signal systems to all parts of the vessel to warn of danger.

== The wreck today ==
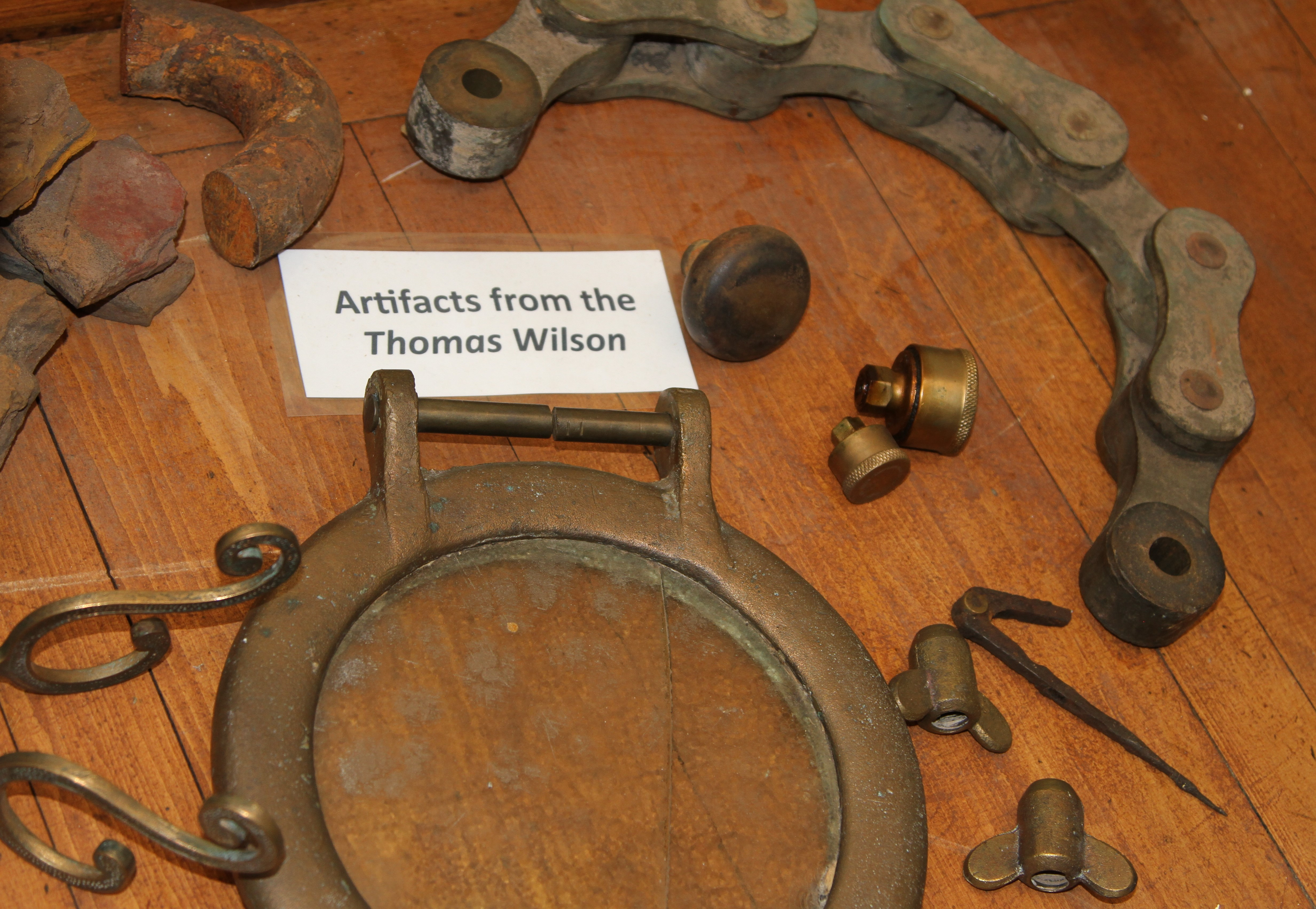
Artifacts from the shipwreck

The ship rests in 70 feet (21 m) of water less than a mile outside the entrance of the Duluth Ship Canal. The stern of the ship is substantially complete, though a large section of the hull of the midship has been broken apart due to other ships dragging anchors through the wreck. The bow is also intact with its turret, capstan, and distinct triple tow rings on the tip of the bow. The interior of the ship has survived largely intact, with relatively few items having been removed by divers. Some artifacts are on display at the Meteor Maritime Museum nearby in Superior, Wisconsin, together with information about Thomas Wilson.

The wreck was listed on the National Register of Historic Places under the name Thomas Wilson (Whaleback Freighter) Shipwreck in 1992 for its state-level significance in the themes of engineering and maritime history.
