= USS Blue Ridge (ID-2432) =

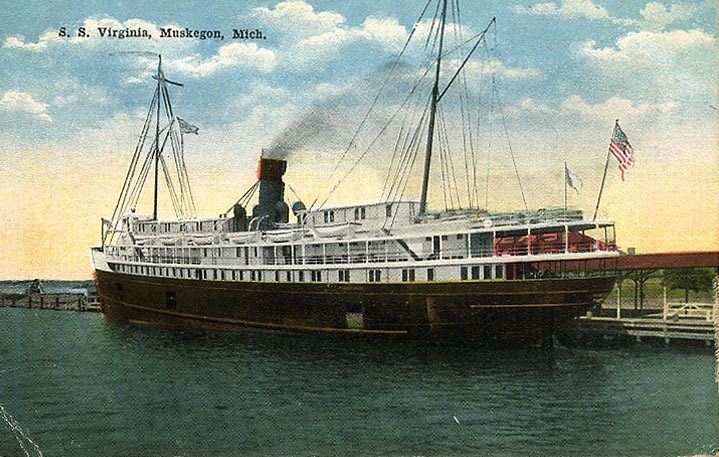
- SS Virginia at Muskegon, Michigan, prior to World War I. Color-tinted post card.

History

United States
- Name: Virginia (1891–1918); Blue Ridge (1918–1919); Avalon (1919–)
- Namesake: Blue Ridge Mountains
- Builder: Globe Iron Works Company, Cleveland, Ohio
- Launched: 2 May 1891
- Acquired: by purchase, 19 April 1918
- Commissioned: 17 October 1918
- Fate: Destroyed by fire, 18 July 1960

General characteristics
- Type: Steamship
- Displacement: 1,606 long tons (1,632 t)
- Length: 269 ft 2 in (82.04 m)
- Beam: 38 ft 3 in (11.66 m)
- Draft: 12 ft 8 in (3.86 m)
- Speed: 16.5 knots (30.6 km/h; 19.0 mph)
- Complement: 87 officers and enlisted

The first USS Blue Ridge (ID-2432) was a steamship in the United States Navy. The ship was named for the Blue Ridge Mountains.

== Service history ==
=== In commercial service, 1891–1918 ===
Blue Ridge was originally constructed as the Great Lakes passenger steamer Virginia built by Globe Iron Works Company at Cleveland, Ohio. The ship was launched in 1891 and was operated by the Goodrich Transit Company between Chicago, Illinois and Milwaukee, Wisconsin.

In 1893, during the Chicago World's Fair, the ship and the whaleback steamer SS Christopher Columbus competed against each other in races.

=== In US Navy service, 1918–1919 ===
Virginia was purchased on 19 April 1918 for use as a Navy transport at Manitowoc, Wisconsin once America entered World War I. The ship was renamed Blue Ridge (ID-2432) and commissioned on 17 October 1918.

On 28 December 1918, the ship arrived at the Boston Navy Yard from the Great Lakes. While undergoing repairs, the war ended and eliminated the need for further service. While still at the Navy Yard, the ship's name was changed to Avalon on 18 August 1919.

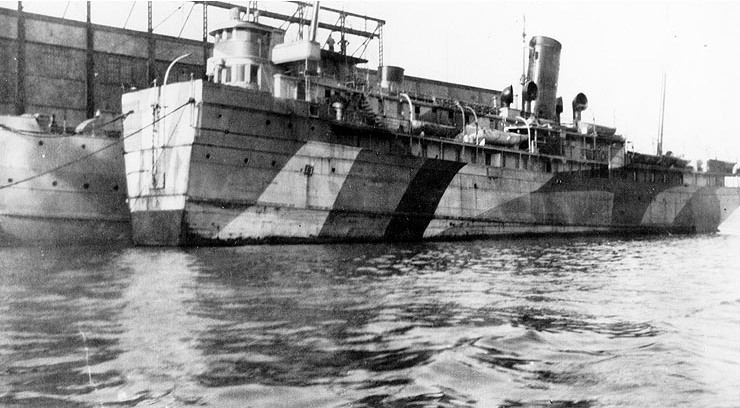
USS Blue Ridge (ID-2432) Wearing camouflage paint and with her bow removed for passage through the locks between the Great Lakes and the St. Lawrence River, circa summer 1918.

=== Avalon — return to commercial service, 1919–1951 ===
The Edward P. Farley Company of Chicago bought the ship on 21 August 1919.

In 1920 The Wilmington Transportation Company of Los Angeles acquired the ship and renamed it the Avalon. The ship entered the company's two-hour daytime Catalina–Los Angeles run between the Catalina Island Terminal in Wilmington and Avalon on Santa Catalina Island. Los Angeles harbor.

During World War II, Avalon served as a transport in the San Francisco Bay Area.

The ship returned to the Catalina–Los Angeles run in 1946 and remained in this service until laid up at the Catalina Island Terminal on 12 February 1951. Most of the equipment and superstructure were removed.

While being scrapped, the Avalon caught fire and burned at Long Beach, California on 18 July 1960. The hulk was towed to Redondo, fitted with a crane and used as a barge. After salvaging parts from the Dominator wreck, the Avalon sank in a storm on 16 September 1964
