= RFA Surf Patrol =

1951 Surf-class freighting tanker of the Royal Fleet Auxiliary

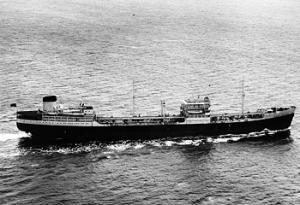

History

United Kingdom
- Name: RFA Surf Patrol
- Launched: 7 February 1951
- Acquired: 14 July 1951
- Commissioned: 17 July 1951
- Decommissioned: 11 May 1961
- Out of service: Sold commercially in December 1969; Renamed Marisurf
- Identification: IMO number: 5345596
- Fate: Arrived at Split for scrapping on 21 July 1980

General characteristics
- Class & type: Surf-class tanker
- Tonnage: 7,742 GRT, 4,361 NRT, 11,500 DWT
- Displacement: 15,800 long tons full load
- Length: 469 ft 6 in (143.10 m)
- Beam: 60 ft 6 in (18.44 m)
- Draught: 27 ft 7.75 in (8.43 m)
- Propulsion: 1 x 4 cyl Doxford diesel. 4400 bhp. Single shaft.
- Speed: 12.5 knots (23.2 km/h)

RFA Surf Patrol (A357) was a Surf-class freighting tanker of the Royal Fleet Auxiliary. She and her sister RFA Surf Pioneer were originally ordered by Polish owners but were commandeered by the Admiralty whilst under construction during the Korean War. Surf Patrol was at the time being built as the Tatry for the Polish Government.

Surf Patrol was decommissioned on 11 May 1961 and laid up at Devonport. She was sold back into commercial service in December 1969 and was renamed Marisurf for D.J. Chandris.
