= SS Kuroshio Maru =

Kawasaki-type oiler / Surf-class tanker of the Imperial Japanese Navy and the Admiralty

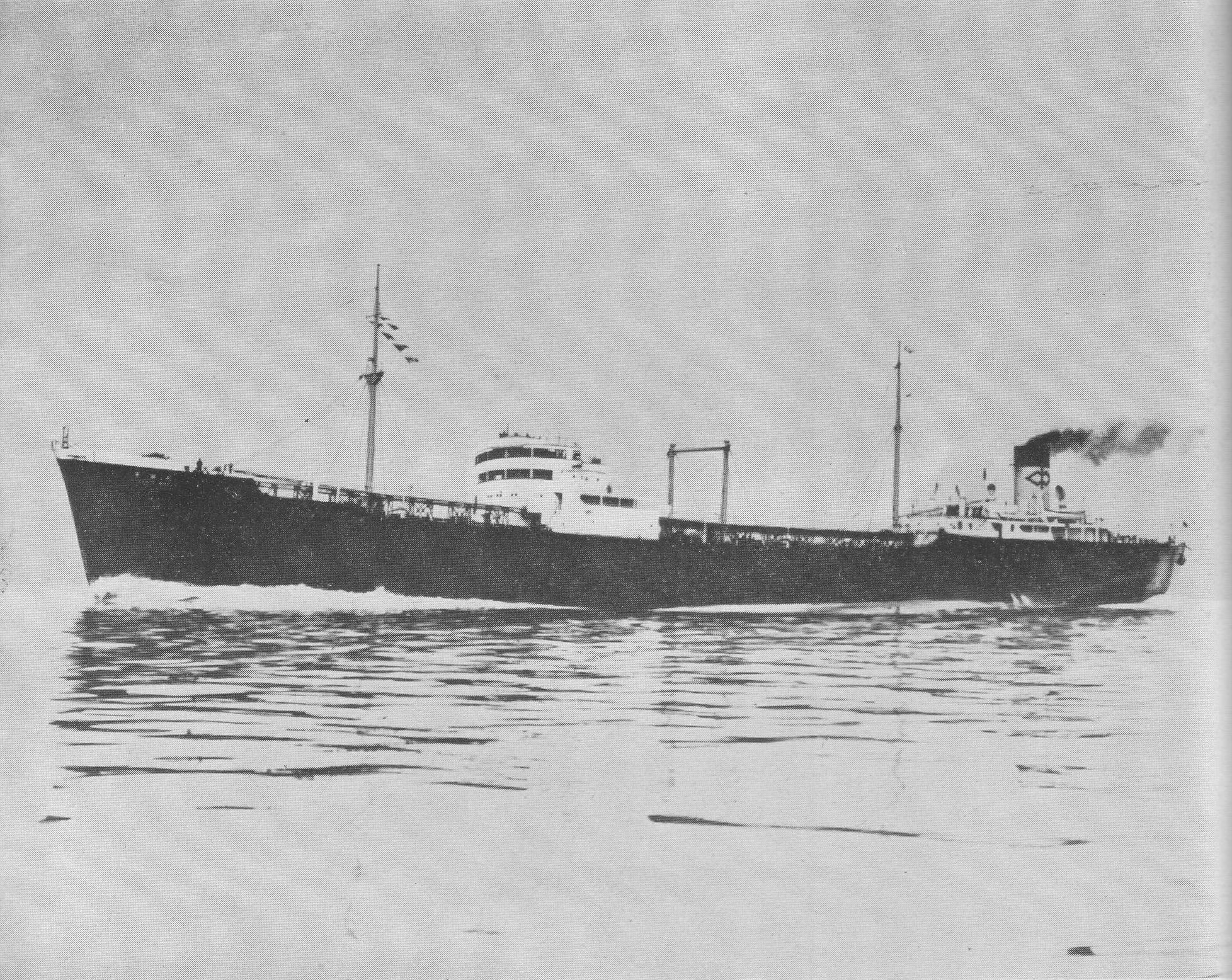
- SS “Kuroshio Maru"

History
- Name: Kuroshio Maru (1938–50); Yung Hao (1950–51); Surf Pilot (1951–60)
- Owner: Chigai Kisen KK, (1938–43); Towa Kisen KK (1943–46); China Merchants Steam Navigation Co / China Tanker Co Ltd (1946–51); Admiralty (1951–60)
- Operator: Tyugai Kaiun KK (1938–41); Imperial Japanese Navy (1941–42); Imperial Japanese Navy (1942–45); China Tanker Co Ltd (1946–51); Admiralty (1951–60)
- Port of registry: (Empire of Japan) Tokyo, Japan (1938–41); Imperial Japanese Navy (1941–42); Imperial Japanese Army (1942–45); Hong Kong (1947-51); (United Kingdom) Admiralty (1951–60)
- Builder: Harima Zōsen KK
- Yard number: 264
- Laid down: 21 January 1938
- Launched: 8 December 1938
- Identification: Japanese Official Number 45674 (1938–45); Code Letters JZPM (1938–45)
- Fate: Scuttled 1960

General characteristics
- Class & type: Kawasaki-type oiler / Surf-class tanker
- Tonnage: 10,519 GRT, 6,206 NRT
- Displacement: 10,383 tons
- Length: 504.7 feet (153.8 m)
- Beam: 66.0 feet (20.1 m)
- Depth: 37.5 feet (11.4 m)
- Installed power: Geared steam turbine
- Propulsion: Single screw propeller
- Speed: 17 knots (31 km/h)

Location where Surf Pilot was scuttled off the coast of Malaya

Kuroshio Maru (Japanese: 黒潮丸) was a tanker that was built in 1938 for Japanese owners. She was chartered by the Imperial Japanese Navy and Imperial Japanese Army during World War II: the ship was sunk in January 1945 at Takao, Formosa by American aircraft. Salvaged in 1946, she was allocated as a war prize to China and renamed Yung Hao (Chinese: 永灏), but was forced to remain at Hong Kong by the British. She was requisitioned by the Admiralty during the Korean War and allocated to the Royal Fleet Auxiliary. She was to have been named RFA Surf Pilot but due to her poor condition she did not serve in the Royal Fleet Auxiliary. She served as Surf Pilot, a tender to HMS Terror until 1958 and was subsequently scuttled off Pulau Aur, Malaya in 1960.

== Description ==
Kuroshio Maru was built as a tanker for carrying oil in bulk was and assessed at 10,519 GRT and 6,206 NRT. Her length was 504.7 feet (153.8 m), breadth was 66.0 feet (20.1 m) and depth was 37.5 feet (11.4 m), and she was reported to displace 10,383 tons. The geared steam turbine engine, placed aft, was manufactured by Ishikawajima Shipbuilding & Engineering Co, Tokyo. It was capable of propelling her at 17 knots (31 km/h).

== History ==
=== Japanese service ===
Kuroshio Maru was built as yard number 264 by Harima Zōsen KK, Aioi, Harima for Chigai Kisen KK, Tokyo. She was laid down on 21 January 1938 and launched on 8 December. Completion was on 28 February 1939. Her port of registry was Tokyo. The Japanese Official Number 45674 and Code Letters JZPM were allocated. She was operated by Tyugai Kaiun KK between Japan and the west coast of the United States. On 15 August 1941, Kuroshio Maru was requisitioned on charter by the Imperial Japanese Navy. She entered the Tama Zosen shipyard on 22 August for conversion work. On 5 September she was registered as a naval auxiliary ship. The conversion work was completed on 17 October and she was subsequently assigned to the Combined Fleet. She sailed from Sasebo on 30 November for Pulau Condore Island. Kuroshio Maru arrived at Sasebo on 16 February 1942 and was then sent to Kobe for a refit by Kawasaki Shipbuilding Corporation.

The charter to the Imperial Japanese Navy was terminated on 1 May and Kuroshio Maru was returned to her owners. She was chartered afresh on 23 May by the Imperial Japanese Army and refitted by Harima Zosensho KK. She sailed between Japan, China, Formosa, French Indochina, Malaya, the Philippines and Singapore over the next few years carrying oil, troops and military cargo. On 10 September 1942 she collided with the coaster Zuiun Maru, which sank. Kuroshio Maru was bombed and sunk on 9 January 1945 at Takao, Formosa by aircraft of Task Force 38, United States Navy. The ship was removed from the Imperial Japanese Army list on 1 March.

=== Post-war history ===
In 1946, the ship was refloated and allocated as a war prize to China and placed under the ownership of China Merchants Steam Navigation Company, Shanghai. In 1947 she was sent to the Hong Kong and Whampoa Dock for repairs. New electrical systems and radar were fitted and her accommodation was rebuilt. During that time the ship was transferred to the China Tanker Co Ltd, Hong Kong and re-entered service in 1950 as Yung Hao with China still claiming ownership. Her crew defected to the Communist Chinese side in March 1951. On 12 March 1951, an emergency Cabinet meeting was held by the Hong Kong Government to discuss the ship. Four days later, the Chinese Government reiterated its claim to the ship, stating that it held the British Government liable for any interference in the free movement of the vessel, leading to the lodging of a claim for compensation. Yung Hao was requisitioned by the British Admiralty on 7 April to prevent her from falling into Chinese hands on orders from Governor Sir Alexander Grantham. The next day, the issue was raised in the British Parliament. Answering a question from Ernest Kinghorn, Secretary of State for the Colonies James Griffiths stated that the requisitioning had been done in consultation with the British Government and was to prevent North Korean and Chinese forces using the ship.

It was discovered that Yung Hao's engine had been disabled, so she was towed from Hong Kong to Singapore, with a Royal Navy crew for the voyage, by RFA Salvalour, escorted by HMS Charity, arriving on 24 April 1951. The Chinese called her seizure an act of piracy, robbery and open provocation. China requisitioned all property belonging to the British-owned Asiatic Petroleum Company in retaliation for the seizure of the ship.

The intention was that she would be repaired and sailed to the United Kingdom for use by the Royal Fleet Auxiliary as RFA Surf Pilot. However, she was discovered to be in a poor condition and was instead used as a tender to the shore establishment HMS Terror at Singapore. Her future was "under consideration" in 1958, and in March 1960 she was scuttled off Pulau Aur, Malaya (2°33′N 104°40′E).

On 5 June 1987, the British and Chinese governments reached an agreement over the vessel and the requisitioning and a treaty to this effect was later signed in Beijing.
