= SS Meteor (1896) =

Whaleback freighter converted to a museum ship

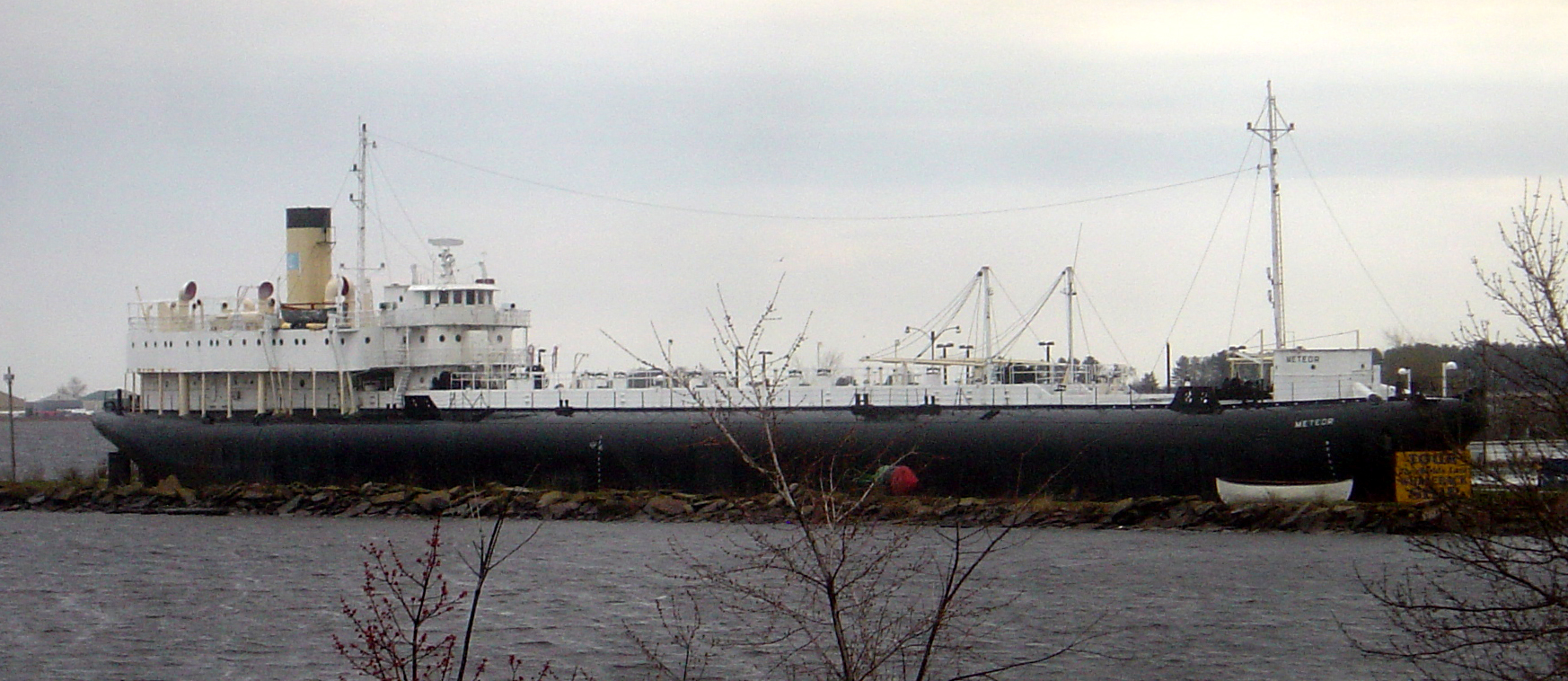
- SS Meteor, the only remaining intact "whaleback", Superior, Wisconsin

History

United States
- Name: Frank Rockefeller (1896–1927)
- Cost: $181,573.38
- Launched: 26 April 1896
- In service: 1896-1969
- Out of service: 1969
- Renamed: South Park (1927–1942); Meteor (1942–)
- Status: Museum ship

General characteristics
- Length: 380 ft (120 m)
- Beam: 45 ft (14 m)
- Depth: 26 ft (7.9 m)
- Meteor (Whaleback carrier)
- U.S. National Register of Historic Places
- Location within Wisconsin Location within the United States
- Location: Superior, WI
- Coordinates: 46°43′23.42″N 92°3′46.57″W
- Built: 1896
- Architect: American Steel Barge Company; McDougall, Alexander
- Architectural style: Whaleback Lake Freighter
- NRHP reference No.: 74000081; 100002377 (decrease)

Significant dates
- Added to NRHP: 9 September 1974
- Boundary decrease: 26 April 2018

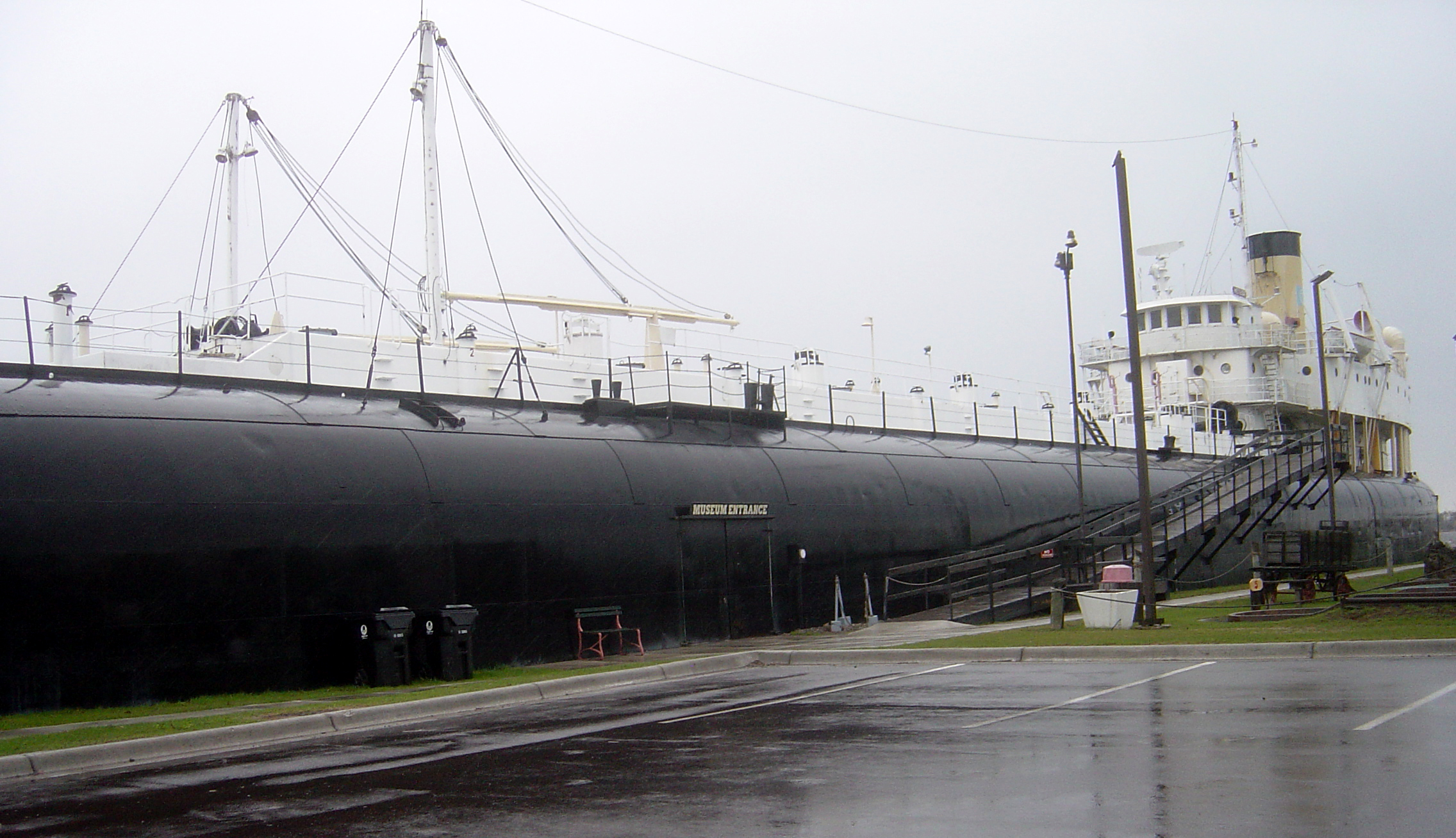
Closer view of the SS Meteor

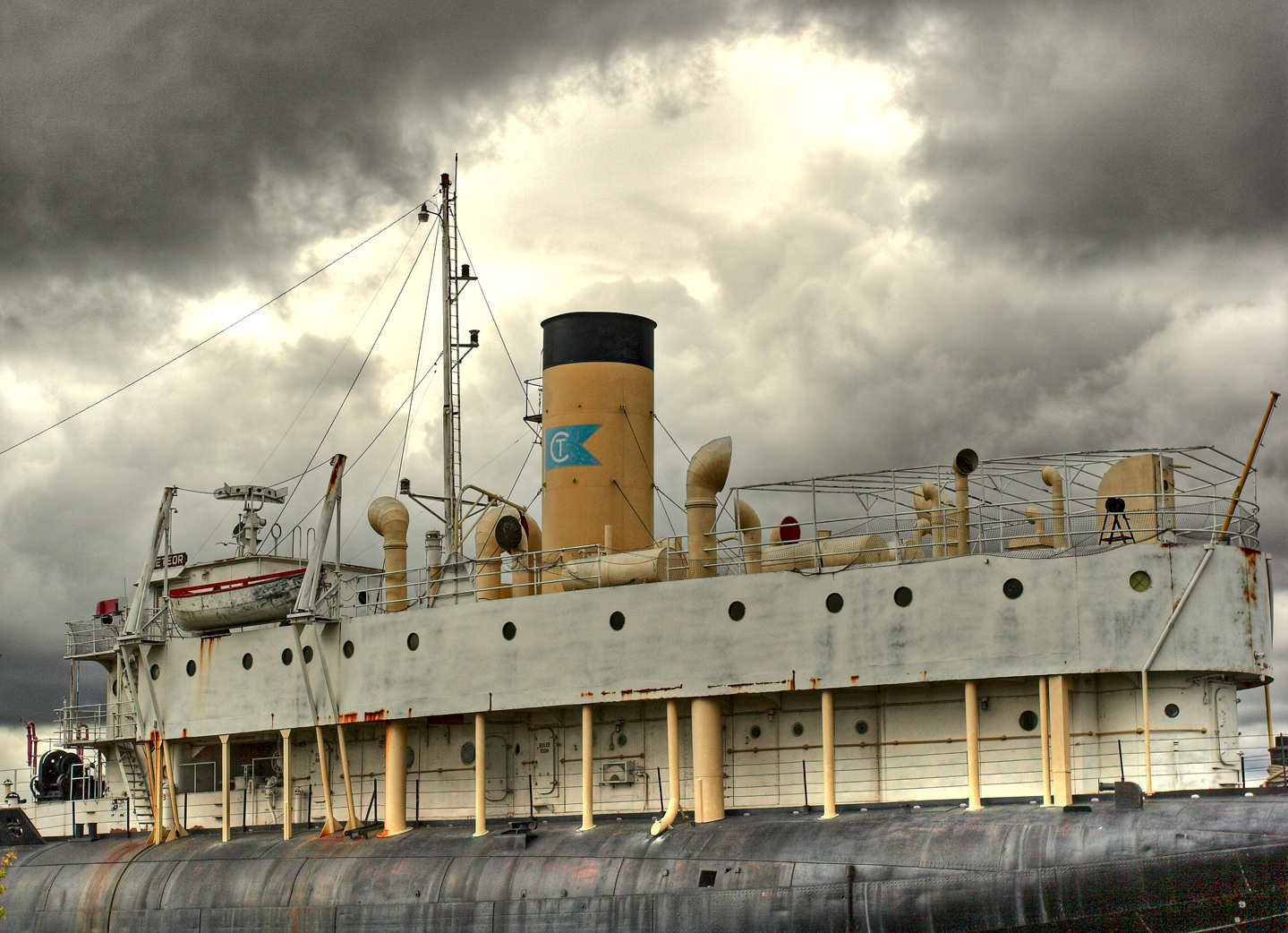
SS Meteor in 2006.

SS Meteor is the sole surviving ship of the unconventional "whaleback" design. The design, created by Scottish captain Alexander McDougall, enabled her to carry a maximum amount of cargo with a minimum of draft. Meteor was built in 1896 in Superior, Wisconsin, United States, and, with a number of modifications, sailed until 1969. She is now a museum ship in the city of her construction.

== History ==
Meteor was built by the American Steel Barge Company (ASB) at their yard in Superior, Wisconsin in the summer of 1896 as Frank Rockefeller; number 36 of 44 whalebacks built between 1888 and 1898. McDougall's expense records listed the cost of construction of Frank Rockefeller as $181,573.38.

She was built for the ASB fleet and joined their barges and steamers in the movement of iron ore from Lake Superior ports down to the steel mills of Lake Erie and coal back up the lakes. She also carried grain on occasion. As a steamer, she often towed one or more of the company's "consort" barges. In 1900, along with the rest of the ASB fleet, she was sold to the Bessemer Steamship Company, the marine division of the Bessemer Steel Company. A year later, she again changed hands along with the whole of the Bessemer Fleet when it joined with seven other fleets to form the massive, 112-boat Pittsburgh Steamship Company, marine division of the equally massive US Steel. She grounded off Isle Royale on 2 November 1905 after she got lost in a snowstorm. Most of the damage from the grounding came from the barge she had been towing – when the ship hit the rocks, the barge continued ahead until it crashed into the Frank Rockefeller's stern. Eventually repaired and put back into service, she sailed as a "Tin Stacker" (so called because of the silver painted funnels) until 1927.

That year, she was sold for use as a sand dredge and renamed South Park. As a dredge, she was used to obtain fill for the site of the Chicago World's Fair in 1933. In 1936, she changed hands again and became an auto carrier. She sailed for several years under this new guise, hauling new autos from Detroit, Milwaukee, and Kewaunee until 1942. She was wrecked off Manistique that year. Had it not been for the great demand for tonnage in World War II, she would have been scrapped. Instead, she was sold to the Cleveland Tanker Company, and converted to a tanker. It was at this time that she obtained the name Meteor, as Cleveland Tanker named their vessels after celestial bodies. As a tanker, she hauled gasoline and other liquids for over 25 years.

In 1969, Meteor was the last of the original 43 whalebacks, but that season, she ran aground on Gull Island Shoal off Marquette, Michigan. Cleveland Tanker Company chose not to repair the 73-year-old steamer because Meteor was a single-hull tanker and because of the severe damage that had been done to the hull. Because Meteor was the last surviving whaleback, she was bought, repaired and taken to Superior, Wisconsin in 1971 for use as a museum ship. She was berthed at Barkers Island where she remains.

Meteor is the last extant example of an experimental class of lakers, other than wrecks such as the Thomas Wilson and the barge Sagamore, a favorite dive site in Whitefish Bay. With the turn of the 21st century, Meteor was in a delicate state; her hull was rusting in places and the interiors were in serious need of repair. Because of her condition, in 2004 she was named one of the 10 most endangered historical properties by the Wisconsin Trust for Historic Preservation. By 2016, restoration had progressed and many portions of the ship were in excellent condition.

== Description ==
Meteor is 380 feet long overall with a 366.5-foot keel, a beam of 45 feet, and a depth of 26 feet. The vessel measured 2,750 gross register tons and 2,013 net register tons. She contains 12 cargo bays which now contain an exhibit on the history of the ship.

Meteor, along with her sister whalebacks, (with one exception, the John Ericsson), were the first major boats on the Great Lakes with all accommodations aft and only a small room for the anchor windlass at the bow. Accommodations on Meteor include crew and officers' quarters, a galley, two dining areas, five showers, and three laundry areas.

== Preservation and stabilization project ==
In 2001, the Great Lakes Shipwreck Preservation Society (GLSPS), Wisconsin Underwater Archeology Association (WUAA), Lake Superior Maritime Museum Association (LSMMA), and the Superior Public Museums (SPM) started the S.S. Meteor Preservation and Stabilization Project. For one weekend in April, volunteers come together to work on Meteor. In 2015, 40 volunteers participated and completed various tasks, including painting and cleaning up the exhibit area.

== Sources ==
- Hancock, Paul (2001). Shipwrecks of the Great Lakes. Hong Kong: Thunder Bay Press. ISBN 1-57145-291-5.
