= SS Royal Arrow =

Arrow-class oil tanker (1916–1959)

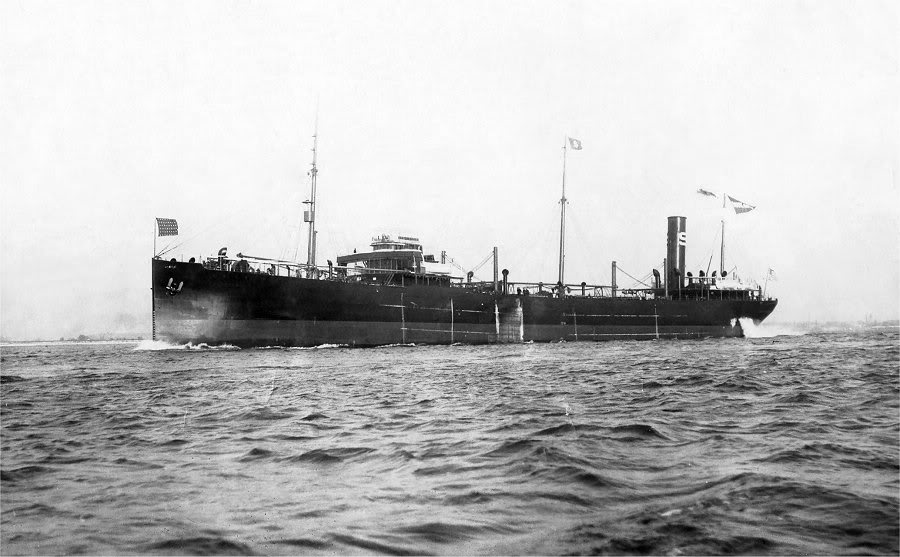
- Royal Arrow photographed during her sea trials in late 1916

History
- Name: Royal Arrow (1916–1946); Laura Corrado (1946–1959)
- Owner: Standard Transportation Company (1916–1917); US Government (1917–1922); Socony (1922–1940); Petroleum Shipping Co. (1940–1941); Brilliant Transportation Co. (1941–1942); War Shipping Administration (1942–1946); Corrada Societa Di Navigazione (1946–1959)
- Operator: Standard Transportation Company (1916–1917); US Government (1917–1922); Socony (1922–1936); Socony-Vacuum(1936–1940); Petroleum Shipping Co. (1940–1941); Brilliant Transportation Co. (1941–1942); War Shipping Administration (1942–1946); Corrada Societa Di Navigazione (1946–1959)
- Port of registry: New York (1916–1940); Panama (1940–1946); Italy (1946–1959)
- Ordered: December 1, 1914
- Builder: New York Shipbuilding Corporation
- Yard number: 168
- Launched: October 30, 1916
- Completed: December 16, 1916
- In service: 1916
- Out of service: 1959
- Renamed: 1946 (to Laura Corrado)
- Identification: US official number: 2214581
- Fate: Scrapped in La Spezia, arrived July 2, 1959

General characteristics
- Class and type: Arrow-class oil tanker
- Tonnage: 7,794 GT; 13,400 DWT
- Length: 457 feet (139 m)
- Beam: 58 feet (18 m)
- Depth: 41 feet (12 m)
- Propulsion: 1 screw
- Capacity: 82,148 bbls
- Armament: 1 gun

SS Royal Arrow was an Arrow-class steam-powered oil tanker built in 1916 by the New York Shipbuilding Corporation, the second ship of her class. She was owned by the Standard Oil Company of New York (Socony) from 1916 until 1946, when she was sold to the Corrada Societa Di Navigazione (transl. Corrada Shipping Company) and renamed Laura Corrado. She was scrapped in 1959 by the Canteri Navali del Golfo (transl. Gulf Shipyards).

== Construction ==
Royal Arrow was the second Arrow-class oil tanker to be built, ordered on December 1, 1914, as yard number 168. She was launched by New York Shipbuilding Corporation on October 30, 1916. She was completed on December 16, and handed over to Socony shortly after. She was assigned the official number 2214581.

=== Specifications ===
Royal Arrow was 457 feet (139 m) long, 58 feet (18 m) wide, and had a depth of 41 feet (12 m). She had a gross tonnage of 7,794, a deadweight tonnage of 13,400, and could carry 82,148 barrels of oil. The tanker was powered by a triple expansion steam engine with a 54" stroke, capable of producing 2,959 horsepower.

== Service history ==
Royal Arrow sailed for six round trips from Baton Rouge, Louisiana, and New York, before being sent to the Pacific Ocean for the foreign petroleum trade there. She stayed in the Pacific for the remainder of World War I, being commandeered by the US government to carry coconut oil and copra from the Philippines to the mainland US. The tanker returned to the east coast of the United States in 1922, transferred back to Socony, and would remain there for 19 years, carrying oil between Texas and New England.

On August 24, 1940, the Federal Maritime Commission approved the sale of Royal Arrow and her sister, Sylvan Arrow, to the Petroleum Shipping Company of Panama, a subsidiary of Socony-Vacuum Oil. This came after the passage of the Neutrality Act in November 1939, where many shipping companies transferred ownership of their vessels to a neutral registry in order to bypass the limitations of the act. Royal Arrow was further transferred to Brilliant Transportation Company in April 1941, and her registry was changed to Panamanian.

Upon the US entry into World War II, the tanker was requisitioned for the conflict by the War Shipping Administration. A gun was installed on the ship's bow, and she carried war materiel from places like Iran, Australia, and India. She served as a U-boat gauntlet runner while transporting supplies. She returned to the US in December 1945, still flying the Panamanian flag. When Royal Arrow's final year-by-year certificate expired in December 1946, she was sold as a "going unit" to Corrada Societa Di Navigazione of Genoa, Italy. The tanker was renamed to Laura Corrado, serving the Italian company in the Adriatic. She arrived at the breakers yard at La Spezia, Italy, on July 7, 1959. There, she was scrapped by Cantieri Navali del Golfo.
