= Whaleback =

Type of cargo steamship

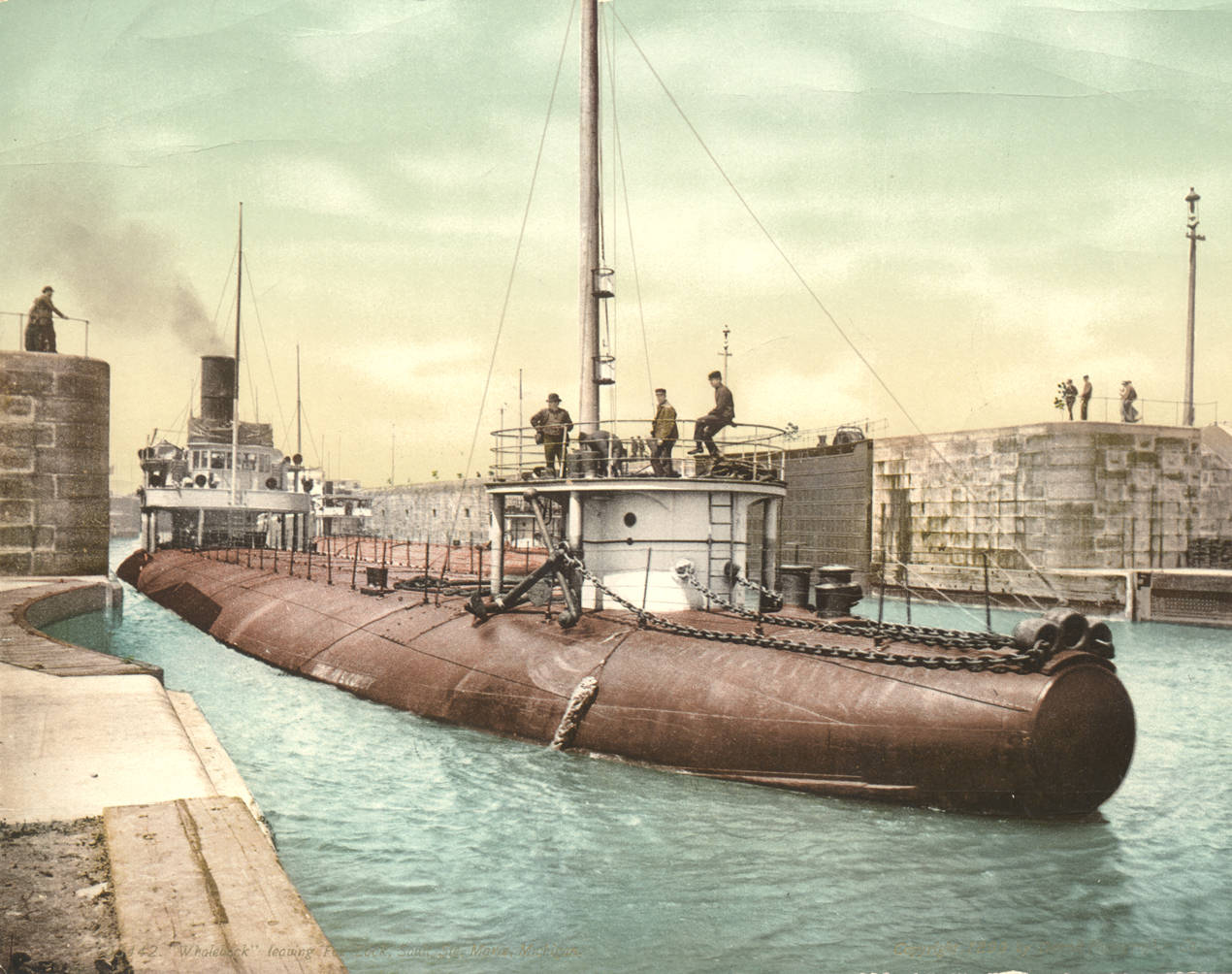
Joseph L. Colby, built 1890, scrapped 1935, was the second whaleback built by McDougall

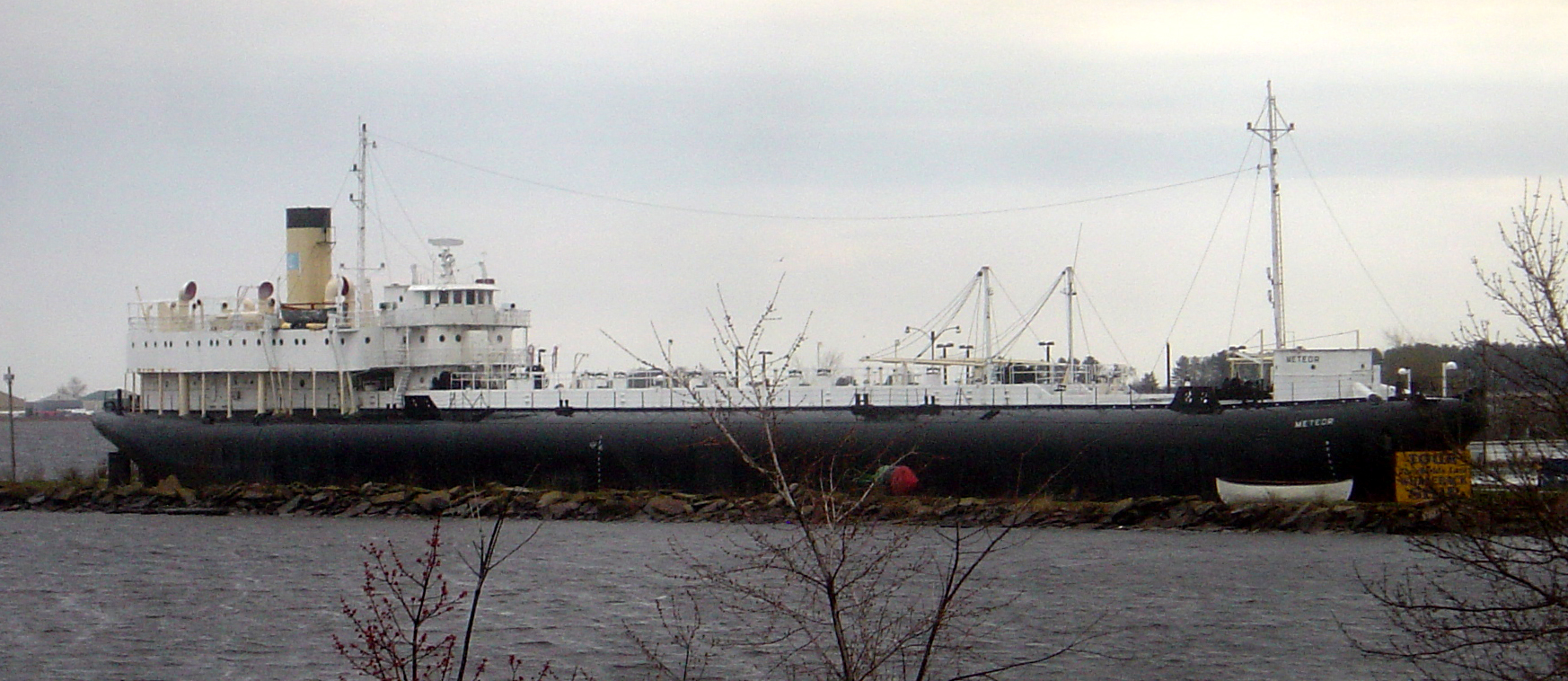
SS Meteor, the only remaining whaleback in existence, now a museum ship

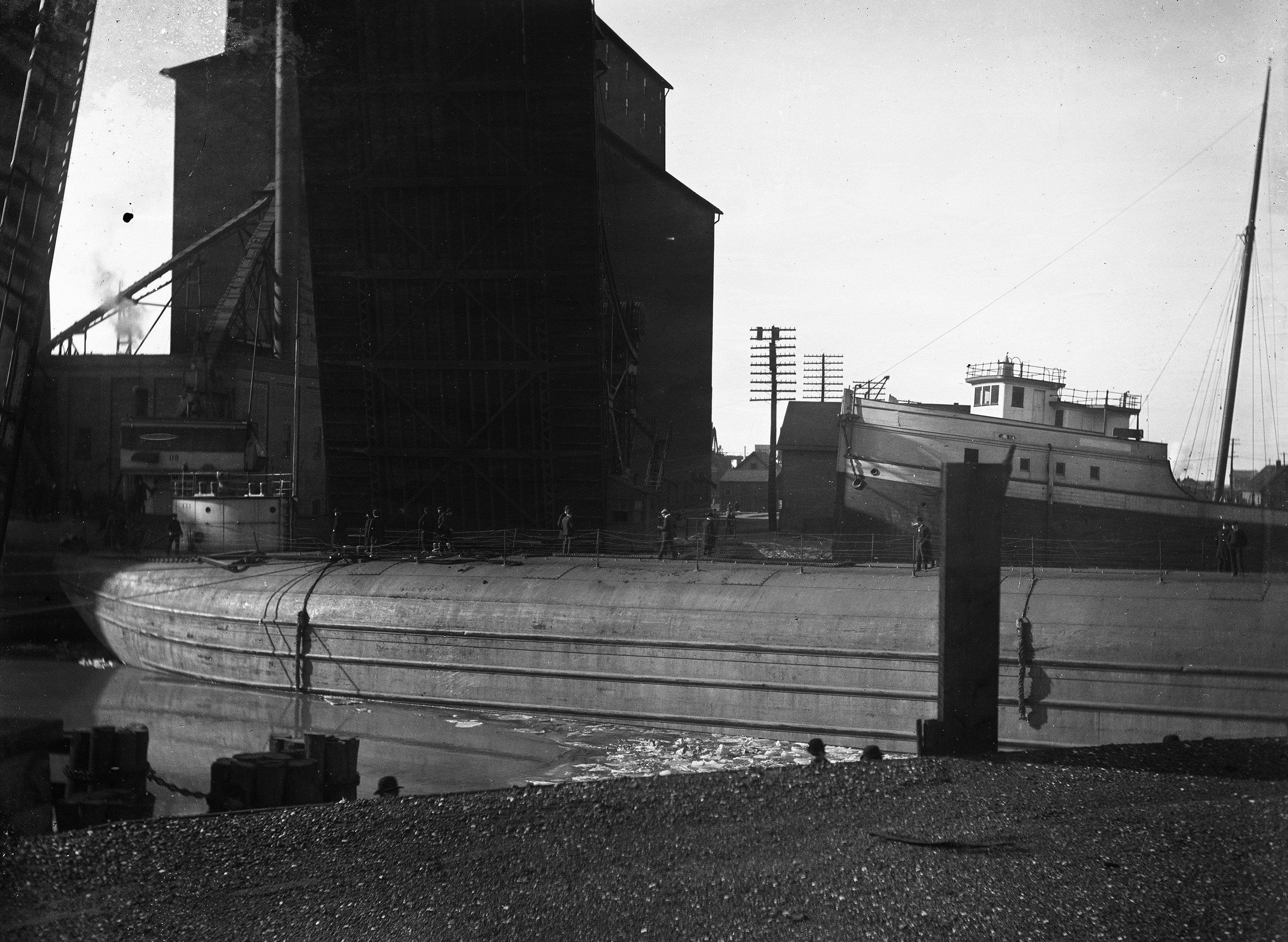
An early photograph of a whaleback barge circa 1888-1890

A whaleback was a type of cargo steamship of unusual design, with a hull that continuously curved above the waterline from vertical to horizontal. When fully loaded, only the rounded portion of the hull (the "whaleback" proper) could be seen above the waterline. With sides curved in towards the ends, it had a spoon bow and a very convex upper deck. It was formerly used on the Great Lakes of Canada and the United States, notably for carrying grain or ore. The sole surviving ship of the "whaleback" design is the SS Meteor, which is docked in Superior, Wisconsin, as a museum ship.

The term developed in common usage in response to the ship's appearance when fully loaded. A total of 44 such vessels were constructed from 1887 to 1898. All but two were built initially as lake freighters for service on the Great Lakes. Six were built at Duluth, Minnesota; 33 were built at West Superior, Wisconsin; 2 at Brooklyn, New York; one at Everett, Washington; and one at Sunderland, England. A number of the Great Lakes vessels left the lakes for service on saltwater seas.

The term "whaleback" has also been applied to a type of high speed launch first designed for the Royal Air Force during World War II, and to certain smaller rescue and research vessels especially in Europe that, like the Great Lakes vessels, have hulls that curve over to meet the deck. An example of the former is the British Power Boat Company Type Two 63 ft HSL. The designation in this case comes not from the curve along the gunwale, but from the fore and aft arch in the deck.

Another application of the term is to a sheltered portion of the forward deck on certain British fishing boats. It is designed, in part, so that water taken over the bow is more easily shed over the sides. The feature has been incorporated into some pleasure craft based on the hull design of older whaling boats, in which it becomes a "whaleback deck".

== Whaleback vessels of the Great Lakes ==
=== Origins ===
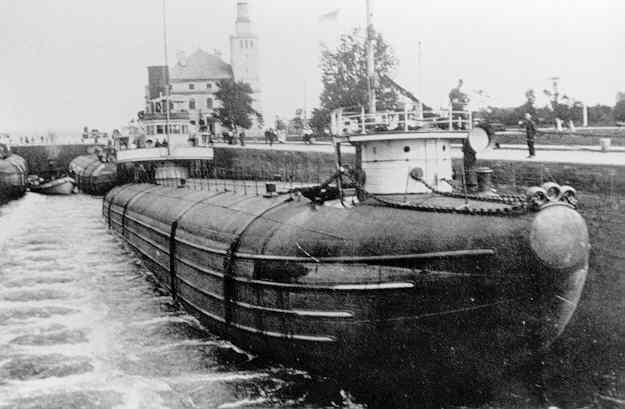
SS Thomas Wilson in the Soo Locks, unladen, with two consort barges, also whalebacks

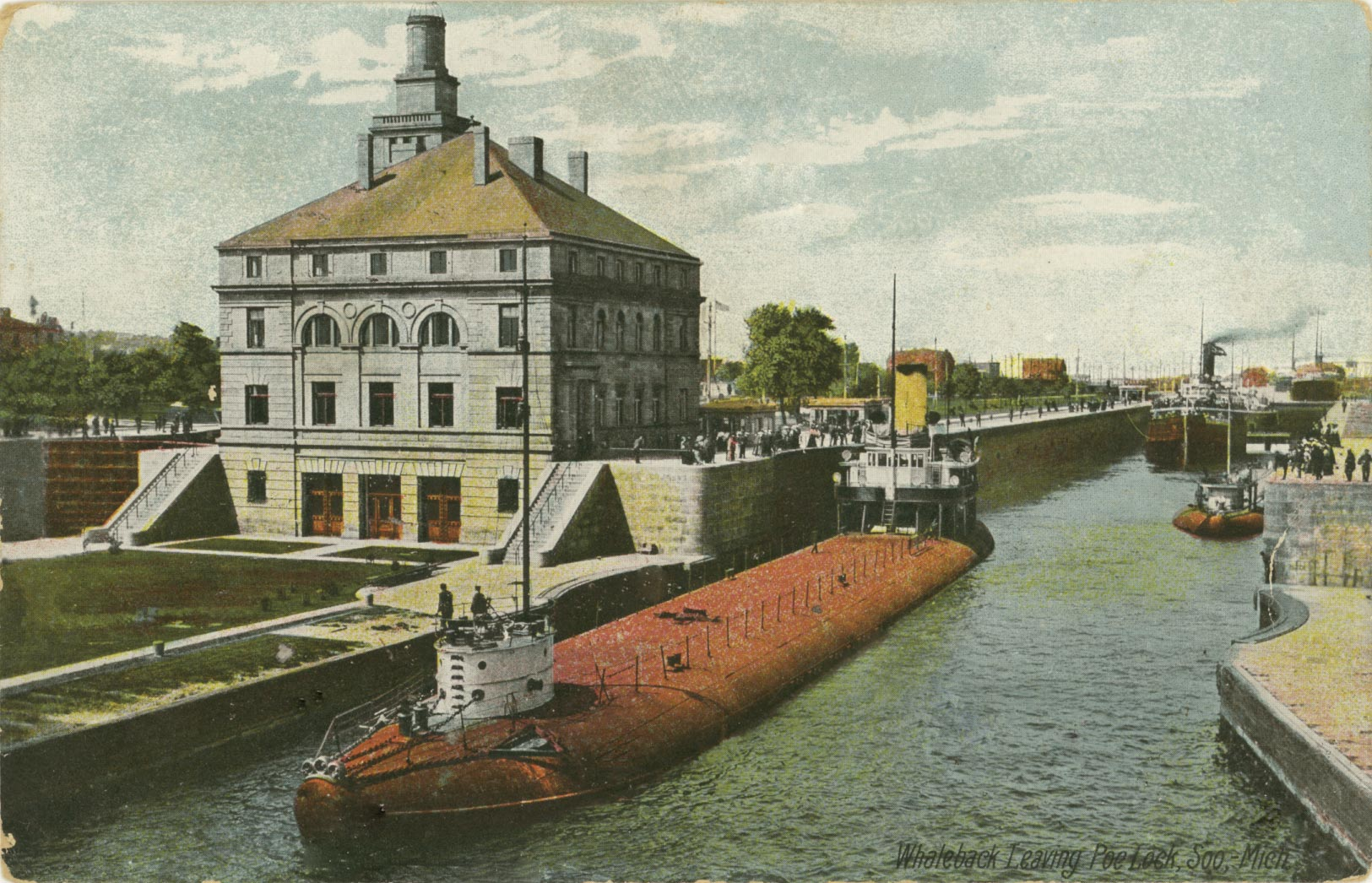
A whaleback traversing the Poe Lock, ca. 1910, showing how low a laden boat would ride

The whaleback was a design by Captain Alexander McDougall (1845–1923), a Scottish-born Great Lakes seaman and ship's master. At the time a vessel's size was limited by the locks and rivers that had to be navigated and by the materials and science of hull construction, not by the power and ability of steam engines to push hulls through the water. It was, therefore, common practice to have a powered vessel towing one or more barges or "consorts". Many of these consorts were converted sailing schooners. Others were "schooners" that were built to be consorts and never intended to sail on their own, except in an emergency. Still others were bulk carriers that had not yet been fitted with propulsion machinery.

McDougall had learned from experience the difficulties encountered in towing these vessels. The bows and spars made them subject to the forces of wind, wave, and the prop wash from the towing vessel, with the result that they often did not follow well. His purpose was specifically to create a barge design that could be towed easily and would track well.

=== Design ===
McDougall's design has been likened to a cigar with bent up ends. The sheer strake (uppermost plank of the hull) of a conventional vessel met the horizontal weather deck at a right-angle gunwale; a whaleback hull had a continuous curve above the waterline from the vertical to the horizontal to where the sides met inboard. The bow and stern were nearly identical in shape, both conoid, truncated to end in a relatively small disc. The superstructure atop the hull was in or on round or oval "turrets", so-named because of their resemblance to gunhouses on contemporary warships. Cabins, decks, and other superstructure were often mounted atop these turrets.

When fully loaded, only the curved portion of the hull remained above the water, giving the vessel its "whaleback" appearance. Waves, instead of crashing into the sides of the hull, would simply wash over the deck while meeting only minor resistance from the rounded turrets. When fitted with hawse pipes for anchors and a guide for the tow cable, the bow somewhat resembled the snout of a pig, from which came the alternate and usually derisive appellation of "pig boat". Jokes and scoffers aside, the design performed as McDougall expected. Whether towed or under their own power, they were seaworthy vessels and fast for their time, averaging 15 knots (17 mph).

=== Significant vessels ===
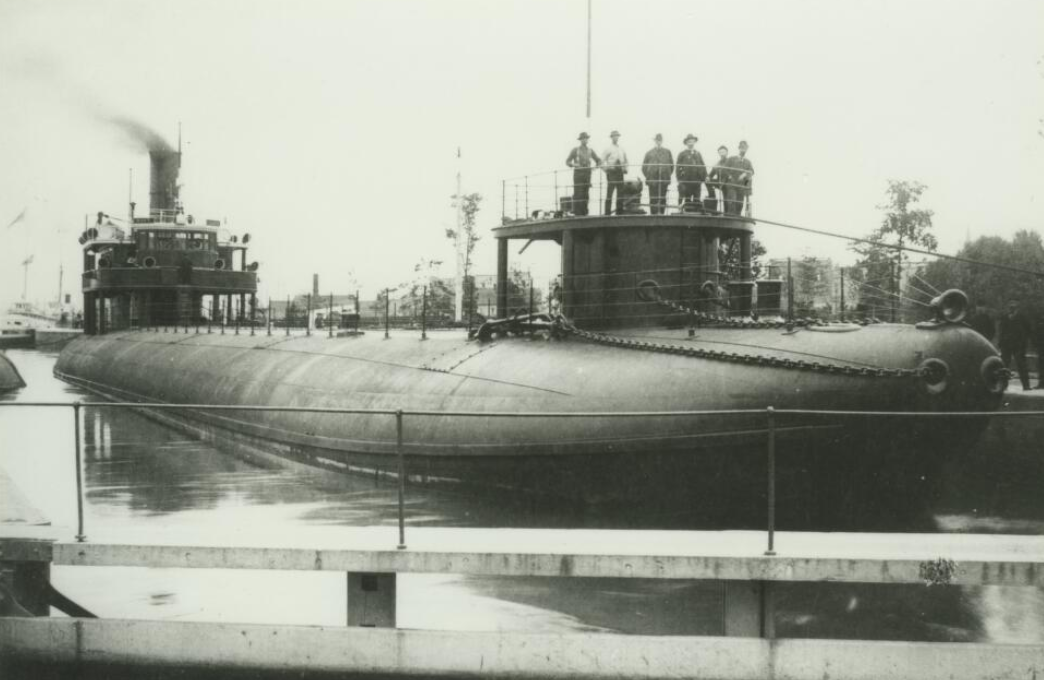
The first self-powered whaleback Colgate Hoyt in the Soo Locks, displaying a bow that earned the vessels the uncharitable nickname "pig boats"

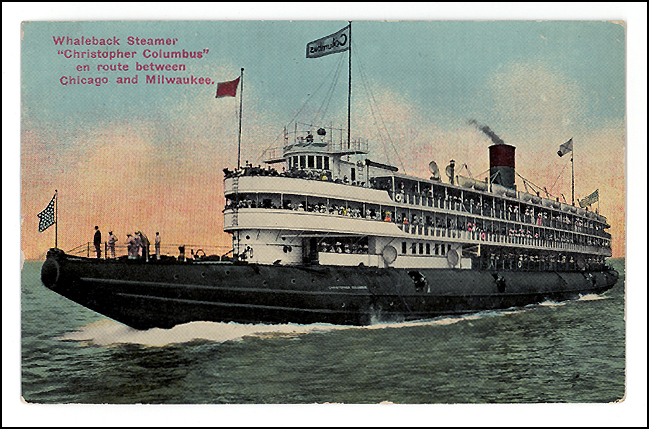
SS Christopher Columbus, the only whaleback passenger ship ever built

Most of the whalebacks (25) were tow barges, all but one of which were identified simply by hull number. Some of these barges had no boiler (and therefore no stack); others had a small donkey boiler for operating winches and for cabin heat (often with a small stack off-center). The first self-powered whaleback was Colgate Hoyt, launched in 1890. The only passenger whaleback was the gleaming white Christopher Columbus, built to ferry passengers from downtown Chicago to the Columbian Exposition in 1893. At her launch she was not only the longest whaleback launched to that date, but at 362 feet (110 m) also the longest vessel on the lakes, gaining her the unofficial title of "Queen of the Lakes". Reportedly, Christopher Columbus carried more passengers in her career than any other vessel to have sailed the Great Lakes. The self-powered Charles W. Wetmore (1891 – 265 ft) was the first lake vessel to leave the lakes. She took a load of grain from Duluth to Liverpool, England, shooting the St. Lawrence rapids in the process. In Liverpool she inspired the design of turret deck ships, which were similar in some ways to whalebacks. After a stop at New York City, Charles W. Wetmore rounded Cape Horn to carry supplies for McDougall's plan to start a shipyard in Everett, Washington. Only one boat was assembled at the Everett shipyard, the City of Everett (1894 – 346 ft). City of Everett sailed for 29 years and was not only the first American steamship to navigate the Suez Canal, but also the first American steamship to circumnavigate the globe. The only British-built whaleback vessel was Sagamore. Another ship also named Sagamore was built in 1892 and sank in Lake Superior in 1901. She is considered the best example of a whaleback barge among Great Lakes shipwrecks. The last whaleback, Alexander McDougall (1898 – 413 ft), was the longest whaleback and the only whaleback made with a traditionally shaped bow. The only remaining whaleback is the SS Meteor (formerly Frank Rockefeller), now a museum at Superior, Wisconsin.

The remains of the Thomas Wilson lie just outside the harbor of Duluth, Minnesota. Thomas Wilson was wrecked as a result of a collision with the vessel George Hadley, which was inbound for the Duluth harbor at the same time Thomas Wilson was departing Duluth. The wreck is listed on the National Register of Historic Places. A well-preserved wreck in 70 feet of water at the east end of Lake Superior was confirmed in 2022 to be that of whaleback barge 129, exactly 120 years after its loss.

=== Drawbacks ===
The whaleback steamer Henry Cort towing the barge Manda

While there was some help from oil tycoon John D. Rockefeller when he was expanding his control in the steel industry, the design failed primarily due to problems with the hatches. At first the hatches were "flush-mounted", and when closed looked almost like part of the hull. The hatch covers and the edges of the hatch openings, however, tended to warp or get bent in use, destroying the watertight seal. Later vessels had hatch coamings. While this was an improvement, it was not enough to make up for the relatively small size of the hatches: because the sides of the boats curved in, the hatches were not as wide as on traditional vessels. The unloading equipment was restricted in its movement, and there were often collisions between the unloading equipment and the hatch edges; slow loading and unloading increases costs.

Whalebacks were vulnerable in collisions. Their low profile made them hard to see, and also led at times to the other ship riding up over the whaleback in a collision, such as the collision between Thomas Wilson and George Hadley. While metacentrically stable as originally built, their design has been accused of not responding well to major refits that may have made some of them top-heavy. For example, Samuel Mather was built as a conventional whaleback in 1892 and was refitted as a self-unloader in the winter of 1923–1924. The converted whaleback did not complete even one year of service; it foundered in a Lake Huron storm in September 1924.

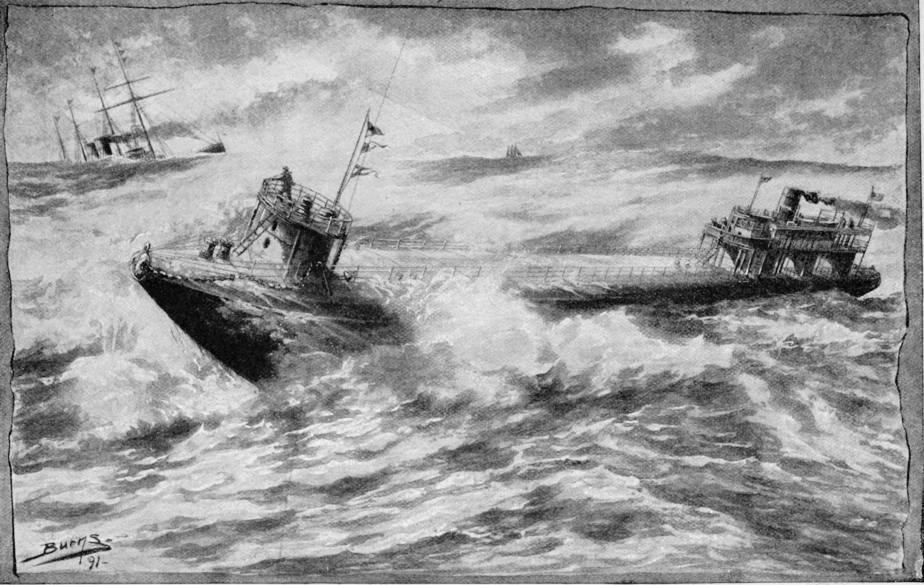
Whaleback ship in storm

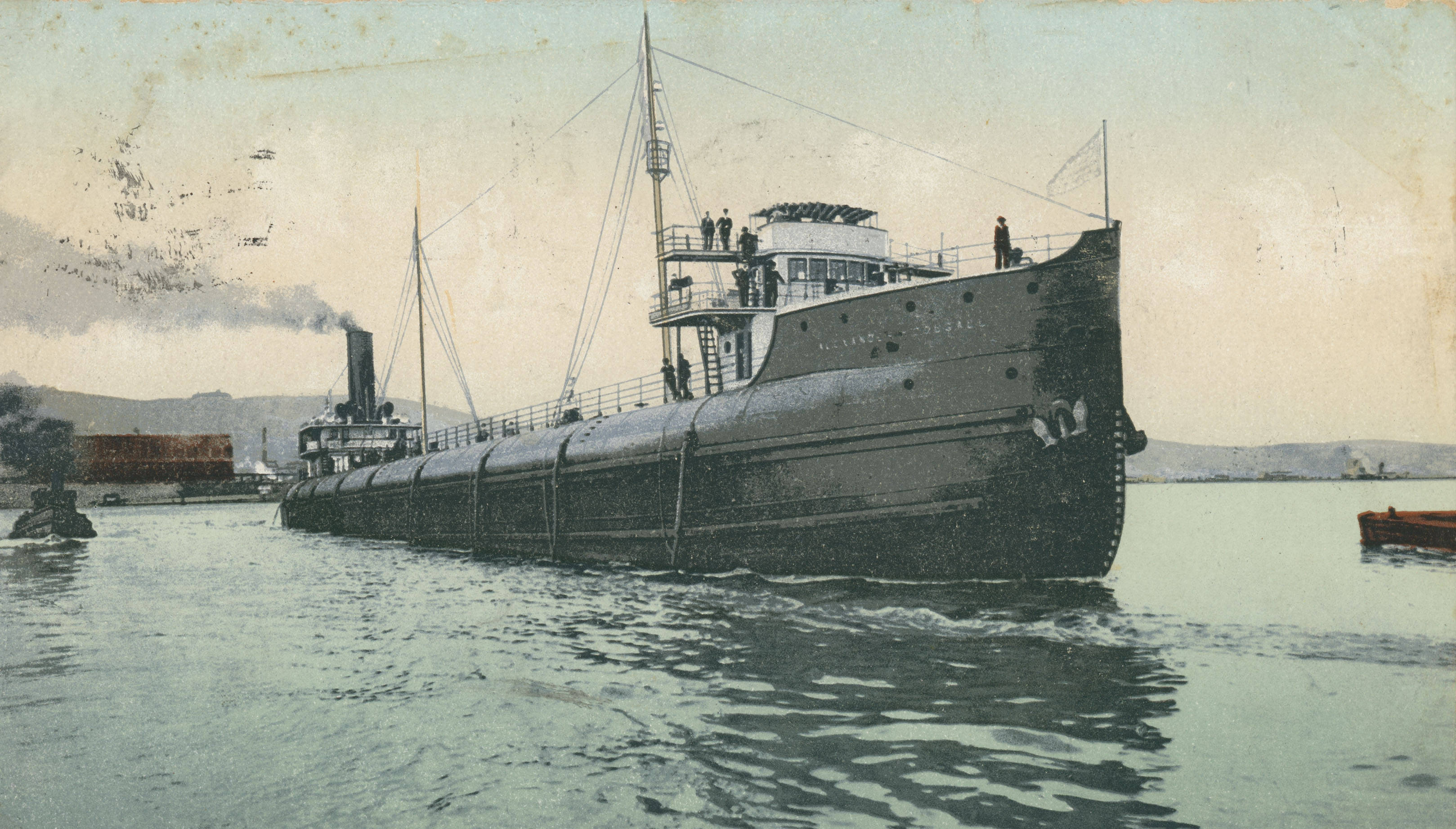
An evolved form of whaleback, with a more conventional bow and enlarged deck houses, Toledo, Ohio, 1908

=== Historical perspective ===
Whalebacks were the precursors of the turret deck ship of the late 19th and early 20th century, which like the whaleback had rounded hulls, but unlike the whaleback had conventional bows and sterns and a superstructure.

Rather than a prototype of the standard bow-helmed lake bulk carriers to follow, most whalebacks were "stern enders", a unique variation on the design that started with R. J. Hackett in 1869 and advanced with Onoko (regarded as possibly the first iron-hulled Great Lakes-style bulk carrier) in 1882. These "lakers" consolidated above-deck cabins at the extreme forward and aft limits of the hull to leave a large open area above the hold for both loading and unloading equipment, and had hulls with nearly box-like cross sections to allow maximum cargoes in shallow water.

== See also ==
- Whaleback Barge 101 – American Great Lakes barge
- James B. Colgate (ship) – Whaleback steamer
- Turret deck ship – Type of merchant ship hull shape

== Sources ==
- Devendorf, John F. (1996). Great Lakes Bulk Carriers 1869–1985. Niles, MI: John F. Devendorf.
- Wilterding, John H. Jr. (1969). McDougall's Dream, The American Whaleback. Lakeside Publications.
