= RFA Surf Pioneer =

1951 Surf-class freighting tanker of the Royal Fleet Auxiliary

History

United Kingdom
- Name: RFA Surf Pioneer
- Builder: Bartram & Sons
- Launched: 23 April 1951
- Acquired: 14 July 1951
- Commissioned: 28 November 1951
- Decommissioned: 13 August 1960
- Fate: Arrived at Burriana for scrapping on 28 February 1970

General characteristics
- Class & type: Surf-class tanker
- Tonnage: 7,742 GRT, 4,274 NRT, 11,500 DWT
- Displacement: 15,800 long tons full load
- Length: 469 ft 6 in (143.10 m)
- Beam: 60 ft 6 in (18.44 m)
- Draught: 27 ft 3.75 in (8.32 m)
- Propulsion: 1 × 4 cyl Doxford diesel; Single shaft; 4,250 bhp (3,170 kW)
- Speed: 12.5 knots (23.2 km/h)

RFA Surf Pioneer (A365) was a Surf-class freighting tanker of the Royal Fleet Auxiliary. She and her sister RFA Surf Patrol were originally ordered by Polish owners but were commandeered by the Admiralty whilst building during the Korean War.

She was launched on 23 April 1951 as Beskidy, and was purchased by the Royal Fleet Auxiliary on 14 July 1951. She was decommissioned on 13 August 1960 and laid up at Devonport. She arrived at Burriana for scrapping on 28 February 1970.
