= Surf-class tanker =

Class of three replenishment oilers of the Royal Fleet Auxiliary

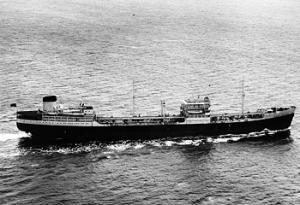
- RFA Surf Patrol, underway in 1956

Class overview
- Name: Surf class
- Builders: Bartram & Sons
- Operators: Royal Fleet Auxiliary
- Preceded by: Sprite class
- Succeeded by: Leaf class
- In commission: 1951–1961
- Completed: 3
- Retired: 3

General characteristics Surf Patrol and Surf Pioneer
- Type: Replenishment oiler
- Displacement: 15,800 long tons (16,054 t)
- Length: 496 ft (151 m)
- Beam: 60 ft 6 in (18.44 m)
- Draught: 27 ft 6 in (8.38 m)
- Propulsion: Droxford 4-cylinder diesel engines
- Speed: 13.75 knots (15.82 mph; 25.47 km/h)

General characteristics Surf Pilot
- Displacement: 10,519 long tons (10,688 t)
- Length: 153.8 ft (46.9 m) p/p
- Beam: 20.1 ft (6.1 m)

The Surf class were a class of replenishment oilers taken up for service with the Royal Fleet Auxiliary (RFA), supporting the Royal Navy during the Korean War. Two were commercial tankers under construction in British yards as the war began. A third ship was captured from in the Far East and brought into the RFA as Surf Pilot. She was never utilised however, and was laid up until being scrapped in 1960. The remaining two tankers were laid up at about this time, and were either sold or scrapped by 1970.

== Overview ==
Two tankers, Tatri and Beskidy were ordered by a Polish shipping company from the British shipbuilding firm of Bartram & Sons. They had been launched in early 1951 but with the outbreak of the Korean War the Royal Fleet Auxiliary purchased Tatri and Beskidy on 14 July 1951, renaming them Surf Patrol and Surf Pioneer respectively. Meanwhile, in April 1951 allied forces had captured a Korean tanker, Yung Hao. Yung Hao had originally been built for Japanese owners in 1938, but had come under Korean ownership in 1947. Yung Hao was taken into the Royal Fleet Auxiliary as Surf Pilot, but was immediately laid up at Singapore. She never saw active service with the RFA, though she remained on their lists until 1958, and was eventually scrapped at Singapore in 1960.

Of the other two Surf-class tankers, Surf Pioneer was withdrawn from active service in 1960 and was scrapped in 1970. Surf Patrol was laid up from 1961, and was sold into commercial service in December 1969 as Marisurf. She continued in civilian service until being decommissioned in 1980.

== Ships ==
Name	Pennant	Builder	Previous name	Launched	Acquired	Fate
Surf Patrol	A357	Bartram & Sons	Tatri	7 February 1951	14 July 1951	Sold in December 1969
Surf Pioneer	A365	Bartram & Sons	Beskidy	23 April 1951	14 July 1951	Scrapped in 1970
Surf Pilot		Harima Dock Co., Ltd.	Yung Hao	1938	April 1951	Scrapped in 1960

== See also ==
- List of replenishment ships of the Royal Fleet Auxiliary
