= 129 (barge) =

American whaleback barge (1891–1902)

Coordinates: 47.086167°N 85.721500°W

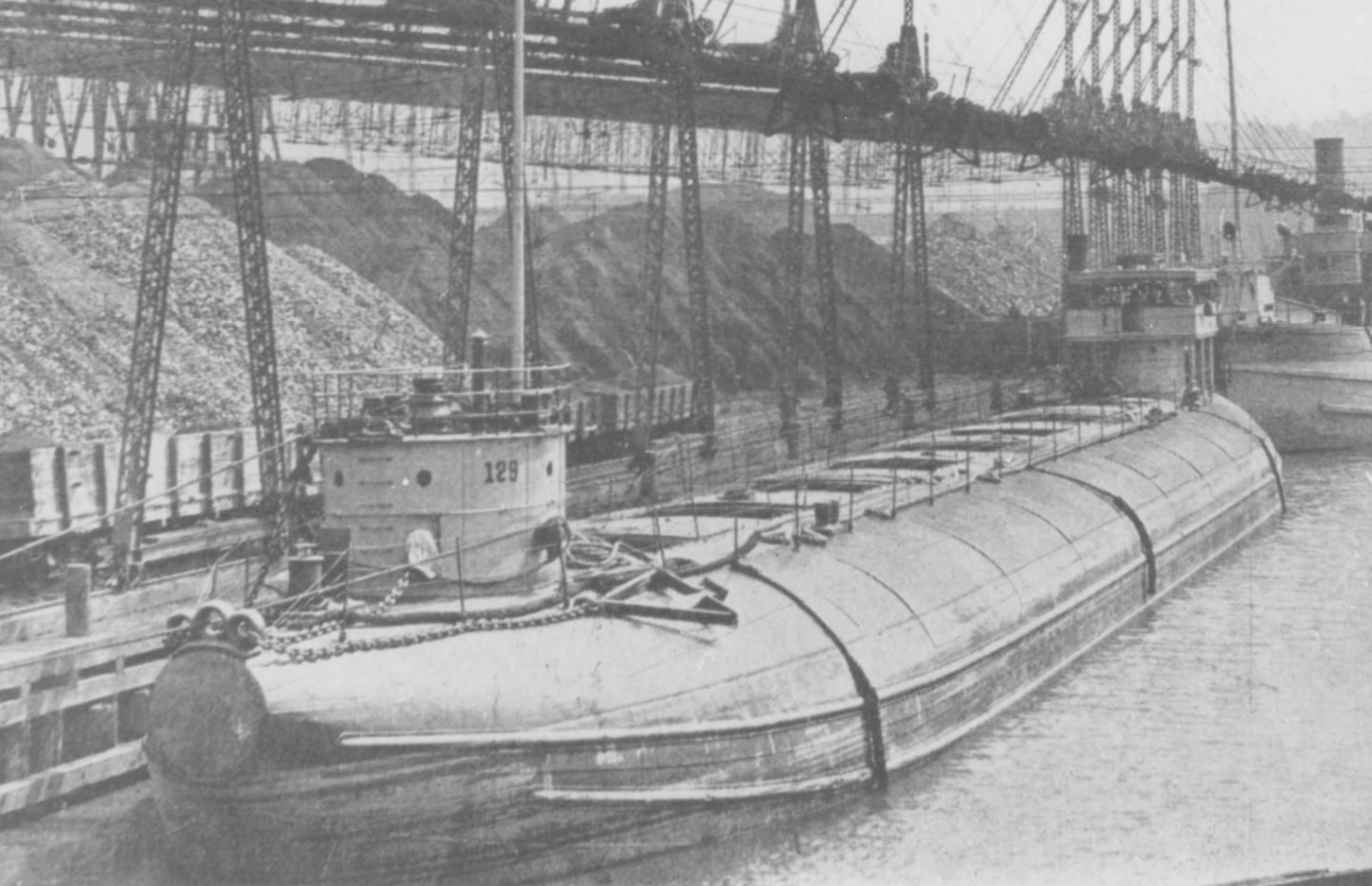
- 129 loading coal c. 1895

History

United States
- Name: 129
- Namesake: Her hull number
- Owner: American Steel Barge Company of Buffalo, New York (1893–1900); Bessemer Steamship Company of Cleveland, Ohio (1900–1901); Pittsburgh Steamship Company of Duluth, Minnesota (managed by Augustus B. Wolvin) (1901–1902)
- Port of registry: Duluth, Minnesota, United States
- Builder: American Steel Barge Company of Superior, Wisconsin
- Yard number: 129
- Laid down: December 5, 1892
- Launched: May 13, 1893
- In service: May 22, 1893
- Out of service: October 13, 1902
- Identification: Registry number US 53276
- Fate: Sank on Lake Superior after a collision

General characteristics
- Type: Whaleback barge
- Tonnage: 1,310 gross tons; 1,265 net tons
- Length: 306 feet (93.3 m) LOA; 292 feet (89.0 m) LBP
- Beam: 36 feet (11.0 m)
- Depth: 22 feet (6.7 m)
- Propulsion: Towed by a steamship

129 (also known as Barge 129, or No.129) was an American whaleback barge in service between 1893 and 1902. She was built between December 1892 and May 1893, in Superior, Wisconsin, (or West Superior, Wisconsin), by Alexander McDougall's American Steel Barge Company, for McDougall's fleet of the same name, based in Buffalo, New York. She was one of a class of distinctive and experimental ships designed and built by McDougall. The whalebacks were designed to be more stable in high seas. They had rounded decks, and lacked the normal straight sides seen on traditional lake freighters. 129 entered service on May 22, hauling wheat from Superior. She was sold to the Bessemer Steamship Company of Cleveland, Ohio, in 1900. In 1901, she became owned by the Pittsburgh Steamship Company of Duluth, Minnesota, when the Bessemer fleet merged into it.

On October 13, 1902, 129 was downbound, loaded with iron ore, in tow of the bulk freighter Maunaloa. The two vessels encountered rough seas while about 30 miles (48.3 km) northwest of Vermilion Point. 129 broke away, Maunaloa turned around, and attempted to retrieve 129. However, the heavy seas pushed Maunaloa against 129; her port anchor sliced into 129's starboard side. 129 took on water and sank fast. All of her crew were rescued by Maunaloa.

In October 2022, the Great Lakes Shipwreck Historical Society announced the discovery of 129's wreck, which was found in 35 miles (56.3 km) off Vermilion Point in 650 feet (198.1 m) of water.

== History ==
=== Background ===
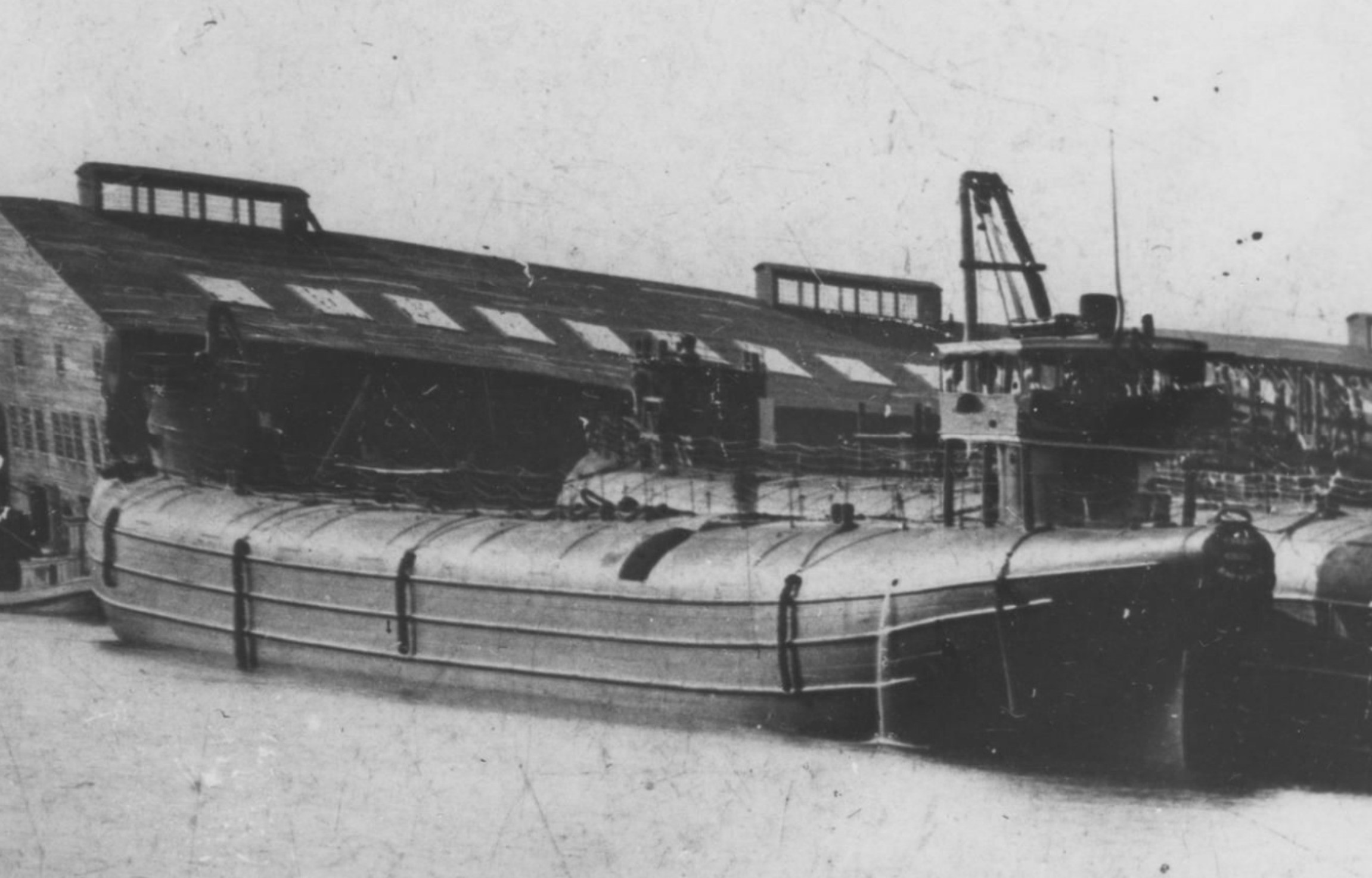
Stern view of 129

129 was a whaleback, an innovative but unpopular ship design of the late 1880s, designed by Alexander McDougall. A Scottish immigrant, Great Lakes captain, inventor and entrepreneur, McDougall developed the idea of the whaleback as a way to improve the ability of barges to follow a towing vessel in heavy seas. Whalebacks were characterized by distinctive hull shapes with rounded tops, lacking conventional vertical sides, and conoidal ends. Their rounded hulls enabled water to easily slide off their decks, minimising friction, and letting them sail quickly and smoothly through the water. Their superstructure was located on turrets mounted on the main deck. The rounded contours of whalebacks gave them an unconventional appearance, and McDougall's ship and barge designs were received with considerable skepticism, resistance, and derision. As they had porcine-looking snouts for bows, some observers called them "pig boats".

After McDougall was unable to persuade existing shipbuilders to try his designs, he founded the American Steel Barge Company in Superior, Wisconsin in 1888 and built them himself. McDougall actively promoted his design and company by sending the steamer Charles W. Wetmore to London and starting another shipyard in Everett, Washington, which built the steamer City of Everett. Despite McDougall's further efforts to promote the design with the excursion liner Christopher Columbus, whalebacks never caught on, with only 44 of them being built.

=== Design and construction ===
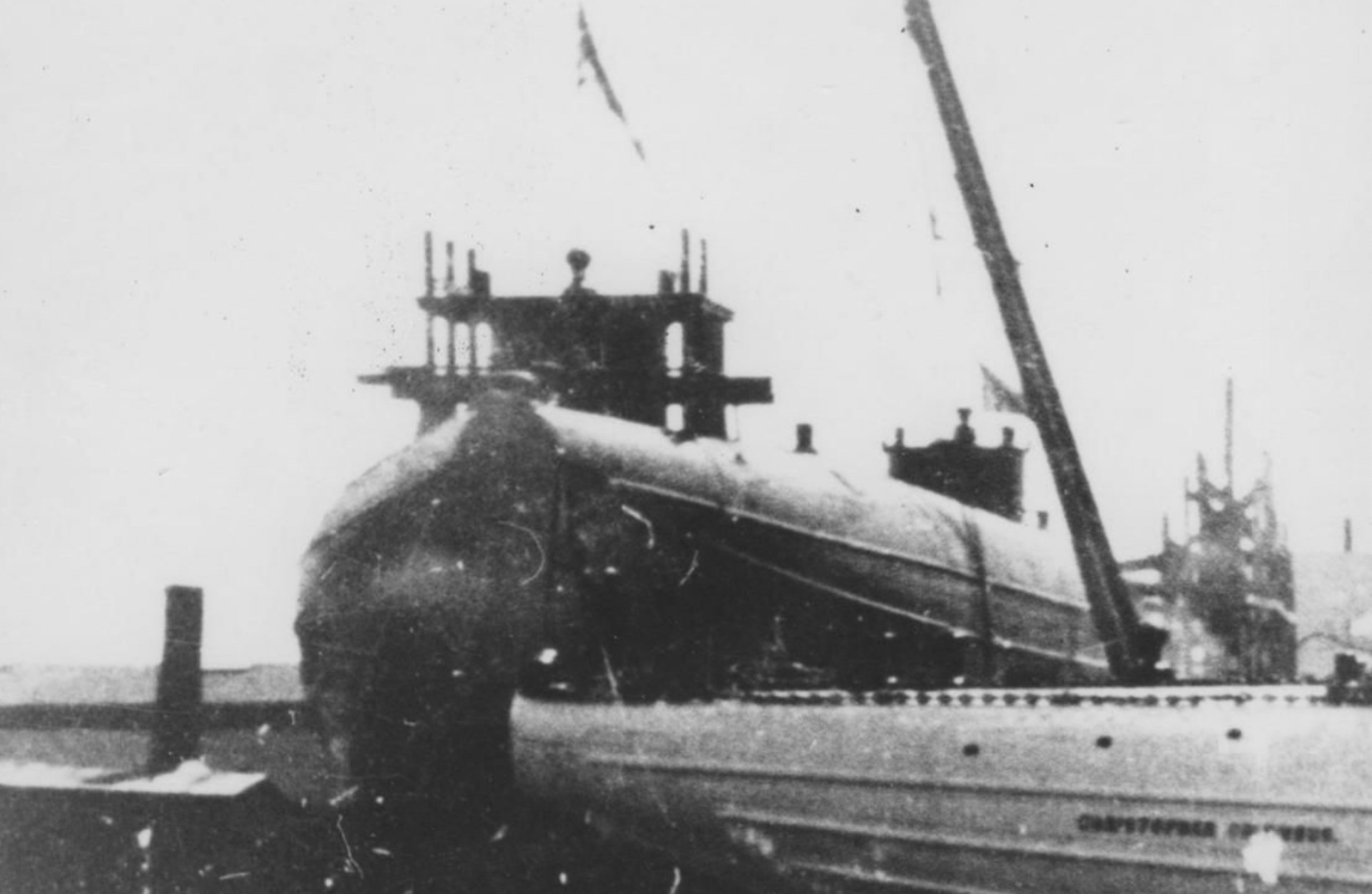
129, with the whaleback steamer Christopher Columbus visible on the right

129 (also known as Barge 129 or No.129) was constructed between 1892 and 1893 in Superior, Wisconsin, (or West Superior, Wisconsin), by the American Steel Barge Company. Her first hull frames were laid down on December 5, 1892. She was launched on May 13, 1893. 129 was the first of six identical whaleback barges launched in spring and summer of 1893. 129 and her sister ships (130, 131, 132, 133 and 134) were the only whalebacks built by the American Steel Barge Company in 1893. She had an overall length 306 feet (93.3 m) (292 feet (89.0 m) between perpendiculars), a beam of 36 feet (11.0 m) and a depth of 22 feet (6.7 m). She had a gross tonnage of 1,310 (or 1,311) tons and a net tonnage of 1,265 (or 1,266) tons. She was an unrigged barge and was towed by a steam-powered ship.

=== Service history ===
129 was built by the American Steel Barge Company for the fleet of the same name based in Buffalo, New York. She was given a temporary enrollment in Marquette, Michigan on May 12, 1893, and was given the US official number 53276. She received a permanent enrollment on June 3 in Buffalo, her home port. 129 entered service on May 22, carrying wheat from Superior, Wisconsin.

129 had no recountable incidents during her career. In 1895, management of the American Steel Barge Company fleet was taken over by Pickands Mather & Company of Cleveland, Ohio. In 1900, 129 and the entire American Steel Barge Company fleet was sold to the Bessemer Steamship Company of Cleveland. When sold, 129's home port was changed to Duluth, Minnesota. 129 and the Bessemer Steamship Company fleet merged into the Pittsburgh Steamship Company of Duluth, managed by Augustus B. Wolvin.

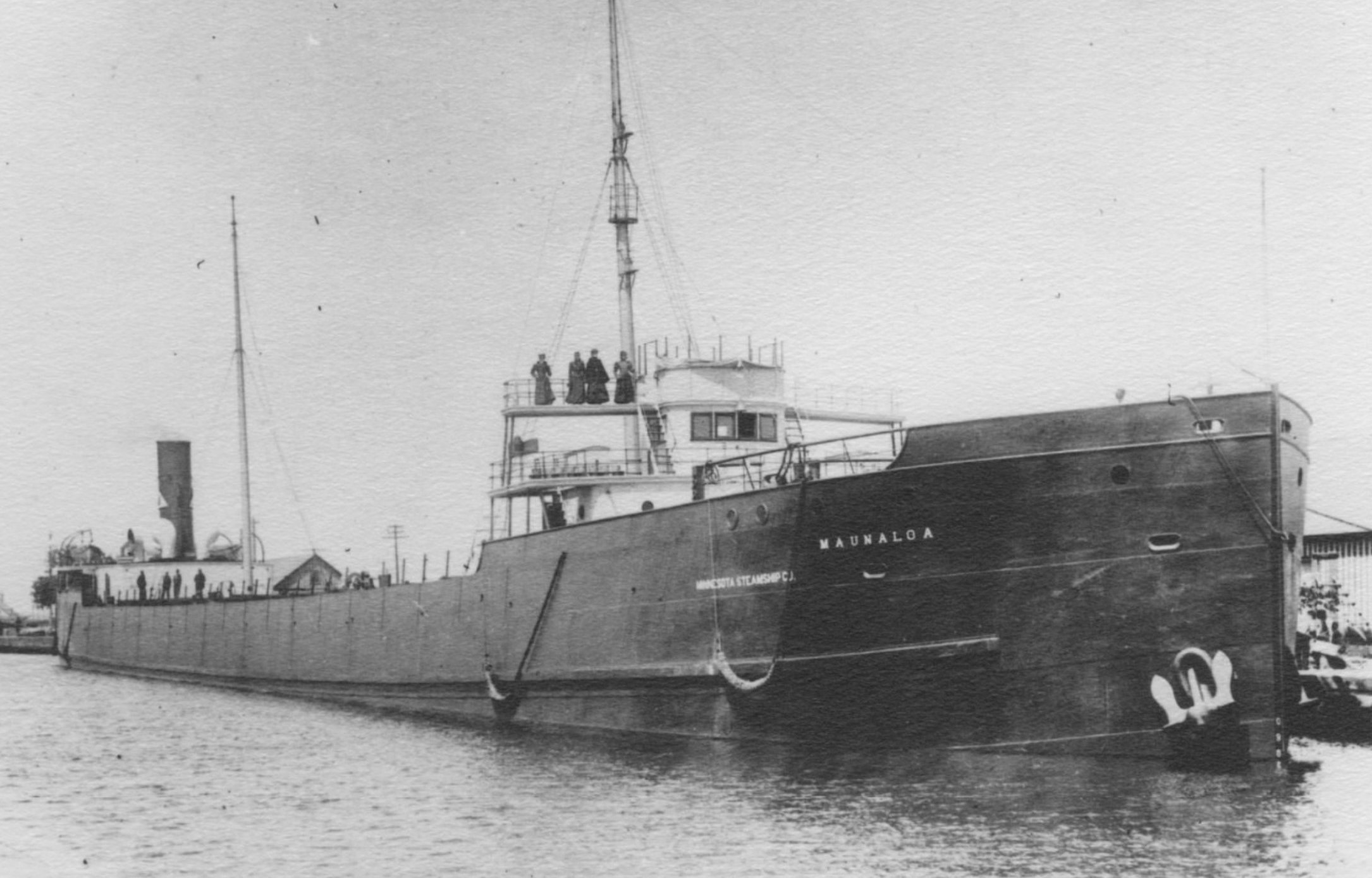
Maunaloa

=== Final voyage ===
On October 13, 1902, while in tow of the 452 feet (137.8 m) steel bulk freighter Maunaloa, 129 was downbound, with 2,300 tons of iron ore in her cargo hold. Maunaloa and 129 encountered rough seas while about 30 miles (48.3 km) northwest of Vermilion Point on Lake Superior. In the gale, the towline between 129 and Maunaloa was severed. Maunaloa turned around and attempted to retrieve 129. However, the heavy seas pushed Maunaloa against 129; her port anchor sliced into 129's starboard side. 129 took on water quickly and rapidly sank. There was no loss of life, as Captain Bailey and his crew were picked up by Maunaloa. Maunaloa sustained no major damage in the collision. 129 was a total loss, being valued at $60,000, while her cargo was valued at $10,000. Her enrollment surrendered on March 25, 1903, in Duluth, Minnesota. She was the fourth whaleback to be lost on the Great Lakes. (Note: In total, eight whalebacks wrecked on the Great Lakes. Four of them 104, 115, Sagamore and 129 were barges, while a further four, Thomas Wilson, James B. Colgate, Clifton and Henry Cort were steam powered.)

== 129 wreck ==
Sonar image of 129's wreck

On October 12, 2022, the Great Lakes Shipwreck Historical Society announced that after a lengthy search, they had located 129's wreck 35 miles (56.3 km) off Vermilion Point in 650 feet (198.1 m) of water. 129, one of eight wrecks located in 2021 by the Great Lakes Shipwreck Historical Society using side-scan sonar, was positively identified in August 2022. She was the last whaleback lost on the Great Lakes to be located. The wreck is in four to five large pieces, with several smaller pieces of wreckage also scattered on the lake bottom. 129 hit the bottom with such force that her bow sheared off, while the rest of her hull folded in on itself in the middle. The tow line is still attached at the bow. Darryl Ertel Jr., director of marine operations at the Great Lakes Shipwreck Historical Society described her wreck: "It's totally destroyed on the bottom. It's nowhere near intact. It's at least four to five big pieces and thousands of little pieces. It's just disintegrated." 129's wreck was explored during the summer of 2022 using a remotely operated vehicle. Maritime historian and author Cris Kohl had previously described her as one of the "100 most hunted Great Lakes shipwrecks".

== See also ==
- Graveyard of the Great Lakes

== Sources ==
About the Great Lakes (2007). "Remember the Whaleback Steamers". About the Great Lakes. Archived from the original on October 5, 2007.
- Alpena County George N. Fletcher Public Library (2020). "129 (1893, Barge)". Alpena, Michigan: Alpena County George N. Fletcher Public Library.
- Berry, Sterling (2021a). "129". Detroit, Michigan: Great Lakes Vessel Histories of Sterling Berry.
- Berry, Sterling (2021b). "130". Detroit, Michigan: Great Lakes Vessel Histories of Sterling Berry.
- Berry, Sterling (2021c). "131". Detroit, Michigan: Great Lakes Vessel Histories of Sterling Berry.
- Berry, Sterling (2021d). "132". Detroit, Michigan: Great Lakes Vessel Histories of Sterling Berry.
- Berry, Sterling (2021e). "133". Detroit, Michigan: Great Lakes Vessel Histories of Sterling Berry.
- Berry, Sterling (2021f). "134". Detroit, Michigan: Great Lakes Vessel Histories of Sterling Berry.
- Bowling Green State University (2021). "0129". Bowling Green, Ohio: Bowling Green State University.
- Croil, James (1998). Steam Navigation and Its Relation to the Commerce of Canada and the United States. Toronto, Ontario: Montreal News Company. pp. 362–64. OCLC 1082014. Google books has images of those pages in the chapter entitled The Turret Steamship
- Duerkop, John (2007). "Some Marine Terminology". Research Resources (definition 65, "Whaleback". Kingston, Ontario: Marine Museum of the Great Lakes at Kingston. Archived from the original on March 11, 2008.
- Durr, Matt (2022). 'Unusual' vessel that sank in Lake Superior nearly 120 years ago discovered. Grand Rapids, Michigan: Mlive.
- Ebeling, Charles W. (2001). "You Call That Damn Thing a Boat?". American Heritage of Invention & Technology. 17 (2). American Heritage Publishing. ISSN 8756-7296. OCLC 11638224. Archived from the original on September 29, 2007.
- Great Lakes Shipwreck Historical Society discovers Barge 129, 120 years after accident. Whitefish Township, Michigan: Great Lakes Shipwreck Historical Society. 2022.
- Kohl, Cris (2005). The 100 Best Great Lakes Shipwrecks – Volume II. West Chicago, Illinois: Seawolf Communications. ISBN 978-0-9679-9766-7.
- Leonard, John (1983). "A Whaleback Quiz". Toronto, Ontario: Toronto Marine Historical Society.
- Marini, Miriam (2022). 300-foot shipwreck discovered in Lake Superior nearly 120 years after sinking. Detroit, Michigan: Detroit Free Press.
- Maritime History of the Great Lakes (1902). "No. 129 (Barge), U53277, sunk by collision, 13 Oct 1902". Ontario, Canada: Maritime History of the Great Lakes.
- Minnesota Historical Society (2008). "Thomas Wilson – Whaleback freighters". Saint Paul, Minnesota: Minnesota Historical Society.
- Nelson, Tim (2022). "Whaleback barge lost for 120 years discovered in depths of Lake Superior". St. Paul, Minnesota: Minnesota Public Radio.
- Oakley, Janet (2005). "Charles W. Wetmore arrives". Washington, United States: Washington State Online History Encyclopedia.
- Ramirez, Charles E. (2022). Cargo ship that sank in Lake Superior 120 years ago found. Duluth, Minnesota: Duluth News Tribune.
- Swayze, David (2001). "Great Lakes Shipwrecks – B". Port Huron, Michigan: Boatnerd. Archived from the original on January 27, 2021.
- Toronto Marine Historical Society (2000). "Ship of the Month No.260". Toronto, Ontario: Toronto Marine Historical Society.
- Zoss, Neel R. (2007). McDougall's Great Lakes Whalebacks. Charleston, South Carolina: Arcadia Publishing. ISBN 978-0-7385-5143-2.
