= 115 (barge) =

American whaleback barge

Coordinates: 48°41′53″N 86°39′17″W

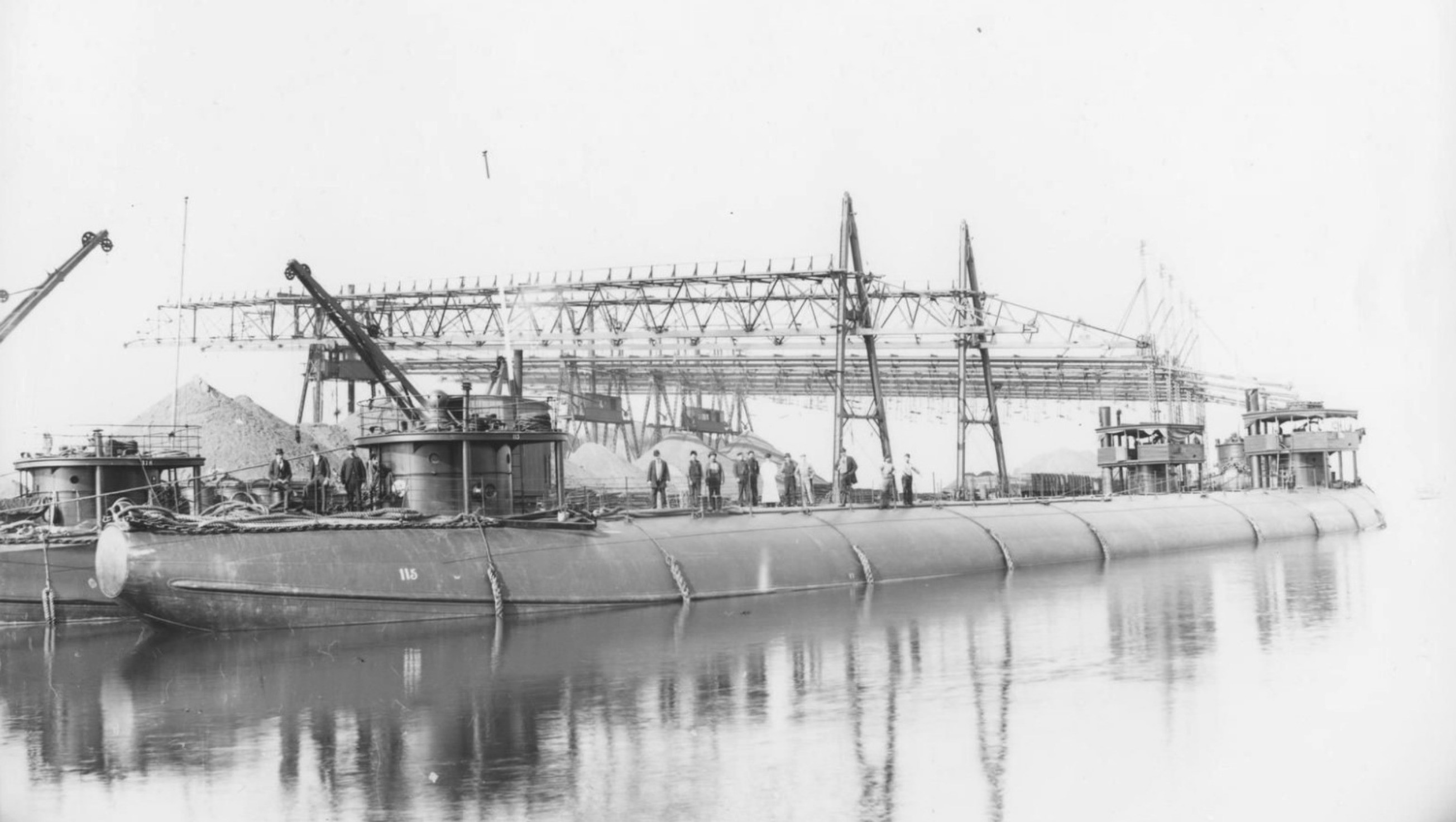
- 115 in 1896, in Conneaut, Ohio, with the barge 118 in the background

History

United States
- Name: 115
- Namesake: Her hull number
- Owner: American Steel Barge Company of Buffalo, New York
- Port of registry: Buffalo, New York, United States
- Builder: American Steel Barge Company of Superior, Wisconsin
- Yard number: 115
- Laid down: May 21, 1891
- Launched: August 15, 1891
- In service: August 25, 1891
- Out of service: December 18, 1899
- Identification: Registry number US 53268
- Fate: Stranded on Pic Island
- Notes: Last shipwreck to occur on the Great Lakes during the 1800s

General characteristics
- Type: Whaleback barge
- Tonnage: 1,169 gross tons; 1,110 net tons
- Length: 256 feet (78.0 m)
- Beam: 36 feet (11.0 m)
- Depth: 18.75 feet (5.7 m)
- Propulsion: Towed by a steamship
- Crew: 8

115 (also known as Barge 115, No.115, or Whaleback 115) was an American whaleback barge in service between 1891 and 1899. She was built between May and August 1891, in Superior, Wisconsin (or West Superior, Wisconsin) by Alexander McDougall's American Steel Barge Company, for the "McDougall fleet", based in Buffalo, New York. She was one of a class of distinctive, experimental ship designed and built by McDougall. The whalebacks were designed to be more stable in high seas. They had rounded decks, and lacked the normal straight sides seen on traditional lake freighters. 115 entered service on August 25, hauling iron ore from Superior.

In December 1899, while being towed by the whaleback freighter Colgate Hoyt from Two Harbors, Minnesota, for Lake Erie with a load of iron ore, the two vessels encountered a storm. After 40 hours of slow progress across Lake Superior, 115 broke away from Colgate Hoyt at 6:05 a.m., on December 13. Colgate Hoyt searched for her for four hours, but due to the scarcity of fuel on board, she was forced to proceed to Sault Ste. Marie. After drifting around Lake Superior for five days, 115 crashed into Pic Island, near Marathon, Ontario. Her crew made it to shore in a makeshift raft, walking for several days, before being located by crew from the Canadian Pacific Railway.

The wreck of 115 was located in 1980, at a depth of between 40 and 80 feet (12.2 and 24.4 m) of water.

== History ==
=== Background ===
115 was a whaleback, an innovative but unpopular ship design of the late 1880s, designed by Alexander McDougall. A Scottish immigrant, Great Lakes captain, inventor and entrepreneur, McDougall developed the idea of the whaleback as a way to improve the ability of barges to follow a towing vessel in heavy seas. Whalebacks were characterized by distinctive hull shapes with rounded tops, lacking conventional vertical sides, and conoidal ends. Their rounded hulls enabled water to easily slide off their decks, minimising friction, and letting them sail quickly and smoothly through the water. Their superstructure was located on turrets mounted on the main deck. The rounded contours of whalebacks gave them an unconventional appearance, and McDougall's ship and barge designs were received with considerable skepticism, resistance, and derision. As they had porcine-looking snouts for bows, some observers called them "pig boats".

After McDougall was unable to persuade existing shipbuilders to try his designs, he founded the American Steel Barge Company in Superior, Wisconsin, in 1888, and built them himself. McDougall actively promoted his design and company by sending the steamer Charles W. Wetmore to London, and starting another shipyard in Everett, Washington, which built the steamer City of Everett. Despite McDougall's further efforts to promote the design with the excursion liner Christopher Columbus, whalebacks never caught on, with only 44 of them being built.

=== Design and construction ===
115 (also known as Barge 115, No.115, or Whaleback 115) was constructed in 1891, in Superior (or West Superior), Wisconsin, by the American Steel Barge Company. Her first hull frames were laid down on May 21, 1891. She was launched on August 15, of that same year. 115 was identical to the barge 116, launched later in August. She was 256 feet (78.0 m) long and 36 feet (11.0 m) wide, and her hull was 18.75 feet (5.7 m) deep. (Note: While the Historical Collections of the Great Lakes at Bowling Green State University note 115 as 36.00 feet wide and 18.75 feet deep (11.0 m by 5.7 m), with a tonnage of 1,169.00 gross and 1,100.00 net, the Maritime Collection of the Alpena County Public Library note it as 36.1 feet wide and 18.9 feet deep (11.0 m by 5.8 m), with a tonnage of 1169.11 gross and 1110.66 net.)) She had a gross tonnage of 1,169 tons, and a net tonnage of 1,110 tons. She was an unrigged barge, and was towed by a steam-powered ship.

=== Service history ===
115 was built by the American Steel Barge Company for the fleet of the same name based in Buffalo, New York. She was enrolled in Duluth, Minnesota, on August 20, 1891, and was given the US official number 53268. Her home port was Buffalo. 115 entered service on August 25, carrying iron ore from Superior, Wisconsin.

On May 11 or 12, 1893, 115 was in tow of Colgate Hoyt, when she was struck by the downbound whaleback freighter Thomas Wilson, which had the whaleback barge 101 in tow. 115 was dry docked in Duluth on May 20, for repairs. 115 broke 16 hull plates on May 3, 1894, when she collided with the steamer Mesaba on Lake George. In 1895, management of the American Steel Barge Company fleet was taken over by Pickands Mather & Company of Cleveland, Ohio. While loaded with iron ore and under tow of the whaleback steamer A.D. Thompson, 115 ran aground in the St. Marys River, below the Sault Ste. Marie Canal in the afternoon on July 18, 1897. She was released on the morning of July 19, after lightering her cargo, which she later reloaded; she sustained no damage in the grounding. In August 1897, 115 was dry docked in West Superior, in order to repair damage she sustained after striking the bottom in an unknown river. Ten of her bottom plates and two of her keel plates needed to be replaced.

=== Final voyage ===
In December 1899, 115 and her towing steamer Colgate Hoyt were in Two Harbors, Minnesota, where 115 loaded 3,000 tons of iron ore bound for Lake Erie, on what was meant to be their final trip of the shipping season. The two vessels left Two Harbors on December 10, and headed for the Soo Locks. 115 was under the command of Arthur A. Boyce, and had a complement of eight crew (including Captain Boyce). As the two vessels left Two Harbors, they sailed into a storm. For 40 hours, Colgate Hoyt and 115 made slow progress across Lake Superior, when at 6:05 a.m. on December 13, 115 broke away from Colgate Hoyt, south of Pic Island. Colgate Hoyt's crew frantically searched for 115 for four hours, but scarcity of fuel on board forced her to proceed to Sault Ste. Marie, where they enlisted tugboats to help search for 115. Initially, 115 and her crew were believed to have been lost.

Location of 115's wreck

115 drifted for five days before stranding near Marathon, Ontario, on Pic Island, located on the north shore of Lake Superior, becoming the final shipwreck to occur on the Great Lakes during the 1800s. Her crew made it ashore in 115's small life raft, making multiple trips between the stranded barge and Pic Island until everyone on board reached safety. Some of the crewmen carried with them extra clothes, while others carried food (two loaves of bread and ham). As well as clothes and the food items, the crewmen carried with them candles and grease. After walking around the island for a while, the crewmen discovered an old, roofless log cabin, containing a stove. They fashioned a roof out of tree branches, and spent the night in the cabin. The following morning, the crewmen tore the cabin down, fashioning a makeshift raft out of the wood. They made it ashore on the mainland, and ended up camping in the bush. The next day, they began walking along the shore to the west, camping in the bush that night as well. After walking for four days, the crewmen stumbled upon a Canadian Pacific Railway track. Following the track, the crewmen managed to make it to Middletown, Ontario, at around noon, that same day. Although all of 115's crew survived, her cook's feet were frostbitten. All of 115's crew made it home in time for Christmas. 115 was the second whaleback lost on the Great Lakes. (Note: In total, eight whalebacks wrecked on the Great Lakes. Four of them 104, 115, Sagamore and 129 were barges, while a further four, Thomas Wilson, James B. Colgate, Clifton and Henry Cort were steam powered.)

== 115 wreck ==
The wreck of 115 was discovered in 1980 after a major search by wreck hunter Ryan LeBlanc at a depth of between 40 and 80 feet (12.2 and 24.4 m) of water, on a rock bottom. Maritime historian and author Cris Kohl's book, The 100 Best Great Lakes Shipwrecks – Volume II. erroneously states that 115's bow with its turret is intact, whereas dive footage shot in about 1980 shows that her stern and its turret are intact, instead of the bow. The bow section is broken up. Due to the force with which 115 pounded against Pic Island, there are twisted steel plates located as high as 50 feet (15.2 m) on the cliff she wrecked against. Her intact bell was retrieved around the time she was discovered.

== Sources ==
- About the Great Lakes (2007). "Remember the Whaleback Steamers". About the Great Lakes. Archived from the original on October 5, 2007.
- "Accident Notes". Buffalo, New York: The Buffalo Enquirer. 1897.
- Alpena County George N. Fletcher Public Library (1) (2020). "115 (1891, Barge)". Alpena, Michigan: Alpena County George N. Fletcher Public Library.
- Alpena County George N. Fletcher Public Library (2) (2020). "Wilson, Thomas (1892, Whaleback)". Alpena, Michigan: Alpena County George N. Fletcher Public Library.
- Berry, Sterling (2020). "115". Detroit, Michigan: Great Lakes Vessel Histories of Sterling Berry.
- Berry, Sterling (2021). "116". Detroit, Michigan: Great Lakes Vessel Histories of Sterling Berry.
- Bowling Green State University (2021a). "0115". Bowling Green, Ohio: Bowling Green State University.
- Bowling Green State University (2021b). "0116". Bowling Green, Ohio: Bowling Green State University.
- Chicago Tribune (1899). "Barge 115 Is Still Missing – If Lost It Will Be the First Whaleback That Ever Foundered In a Storm". Chicago Tribune. Chicago, Illinois. p. 3 – via Newspapers.com.
- Croil, James (1998). Steam Navigation and Its Relation to the Commerce of Canada and the United States. Toronto, Ontario: Montreal News Company. pp. 362–64. OCLC 1082014. Google books has images of those pages in the chapter entitled The Turret Steamship
- Duerkop, John (2007). "Some Marine Terminology". Research Resources (definition 65, "Whaleback". Kingston, Ontario: Marine Museum of the Great Lakes at Kingston. Archived from the original on March 11, 2008.
- Ebeling, Charles W. (2001). "You Call That Damn Thing a Boat?". American Heritage of Invention & Technology. 17 (2). American Heritage Publishing. ISSN 8756-7296. OCLC 11638224. Archived from the original on September 29, 2007.
- "Here and There Afloat". Buffalo Courier. Buffalo, New York: Buffalo Commercial. August 25, 1897.
- Kohl, Cris (2005). The 100 Best Great Lakes Shipwrecks – Volume II. West Chicago, Illinois: Seawolf Communications. ISBN 978-0-9679-9766-7.
- Leonard, John (1983). "A Whaleback Quiz". Toronto, Ontario, Canada: Toronto Marine Historical Society.
- Maritime History of the Great Lakes (1897). "Barge 115 (Barge), U53268, 1897". Ontario, Canada: Maritime History of the Great Lakes (sourced from various newspaper articles).
- Maritime History of the Great Lakes (1899). "Barge 115 (Barge), U53268, aground, 13 Dec 1899". Ontario, Canada: Maritime History of the Great Lakes (sourced from various newspaper articles).
- McWilliam, Scott (2021). "Diving Whaleback Barge 115 circa 1980". Scott McWilliam (dive footage shot by Ryan LeBlanc, Dan Juss, Cheril Juss, Katherine McDonald and Jack McDonald) – via YouTube.
- Minnesota Historical Society (2008). "Thomas Wilson – Whaleback freighters". Saint Paul, Minnesota: Minnesota Historical Society.
- Oakley, Janet (2005). "Charles W. Wetmore arrives". Washington, United States: Washington State online history encyclopedia.
- Our Ontario (2021). "Whaleback 115" (PDF). Ontario, Canada: Our Ontario.
- Save Ontario Shipwrecks (2018). "Whaleback 115". Blenheim, Ontario: Save Ontario Shipwrecks.
- Swayze, David (2001). "Great Lakes Shipwrecks – B". Port Huron, Michigan: Boatnerd. Archived from the original on January 27, 2021.
- Toronto Marine Historical Society (2000). "Ship of the Month No.260". Toronto, Ontario: Toronto Marine Historical Society.
- "Whaleback Aground". Buffalo, New York: The Buffalo Commercial. 1897.
- Zoss, Neel R. (2007). McDougall's Great Lakes Whalebacks. Charleston, South Carolina: Arcadia Publishing. ISBN 978-0-7385-5143-2.
