= 104 (barge) =

American whaleback barge

Coordinates: 41°30′16″N 81°43′21″W

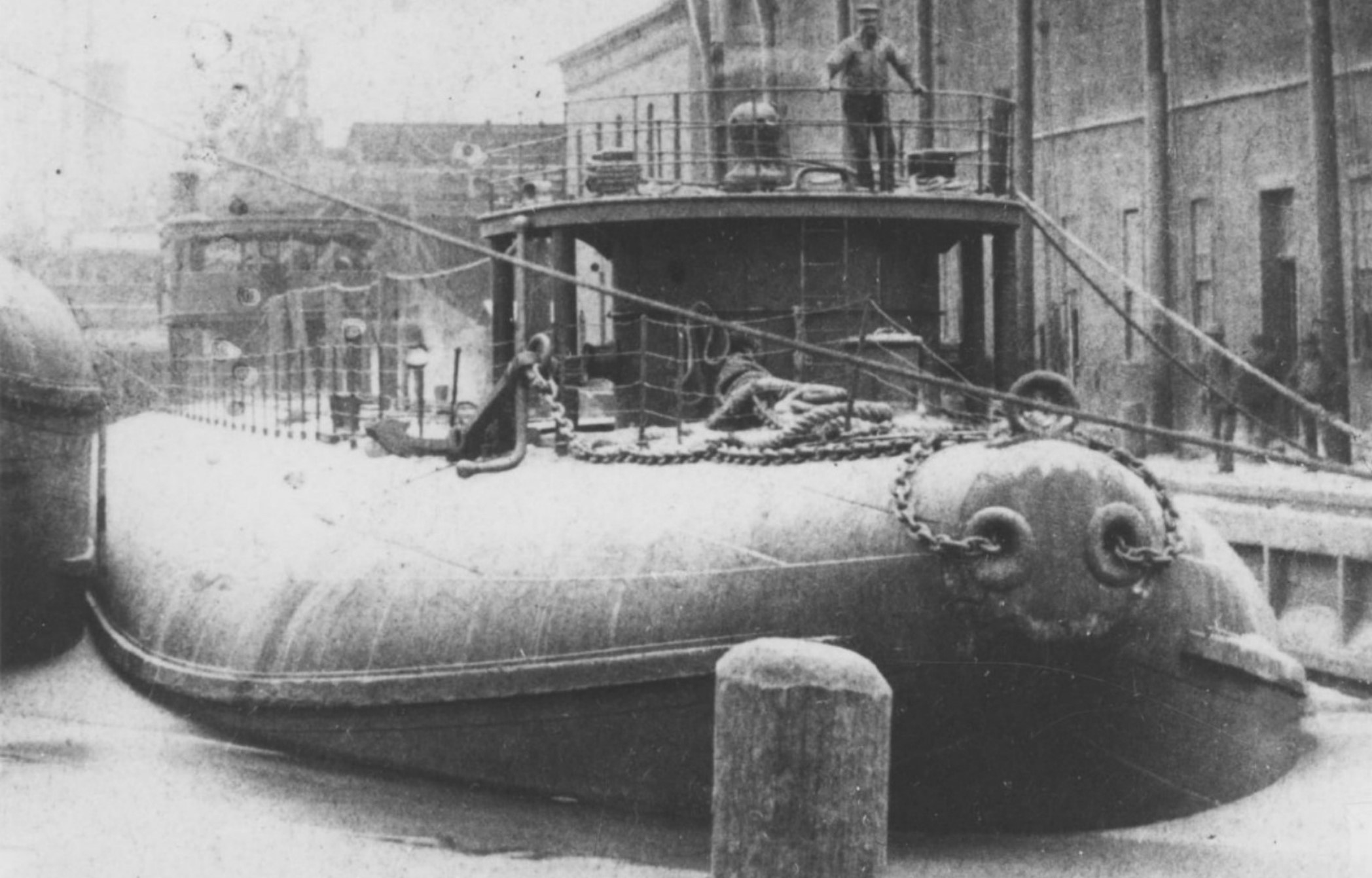
- 104 before she sank

History

United States
- Name: 104
- Namesake: Her hull number
- Owner: American Steel Barge Company of Buffalo, New York
- Port of registry: Buffalo, New York, United States
- Builder: American Steel Barge Company of Duluth, Minnesota
- Yard number: 104
- Laid down: October 23, 1889
- Launched: February 6, 1890
- In service: April 21, 1890
- Out of service: November 10, 1898
- Identification: Registry number US 53257
- Fate: Sank on Lake Erie after striking the West Breakwater in Cleveland, Ohio

General characteristics
- Type: Whaleback barge
- Tonnage: 1,295 gross tons; 1,230 net tons
- Length: 288 feet (87.8 m) LOA; 276.5 feet (84.3 m) LBP
- Beam: 36.1 feet (11.0 m)
- Depth: 18.9 feet (5.8 m)
- Propulsion: Towed by a steamship
- Capacity: 3,300 tons
- Crew: 7

104 (also known as Barge 104, or No.104) was an American whaleback barge in service between 1890 and 1898. The fourth whaleback constructed, she was built between October 1889 and February 1890, in Duluth, Minnesota by Alexander McDougall's American Steel Barge Company, for McDougall's fleet of the same name, based in Buffalo, New York. She was a whaleback, a class of distinctive, experimental ship designed and built by McDougall. The whalebacks were designed to be more stable in high seas. They had rounded decks, and lacked the normal straight sides seen on traditional lake freighters. 104 entered service on April 21, hauling iron ore from Two Harbors, Minnesota.

On November 10, 1898, while being towed out of Cleveland harbour with a cargo of coal bound for Duluth, she broke away from the tug Alva B. 104 crashed into Cleveland's west breakwater. She sank quickly, with her crew being rescued by the Cleveland United States Life-Saving Service. 104 was a total loss, becoming the first whaleback to be lost on the Great Lakes.

== History ==
=== Background ===
104 was a whaleback, an innovative but not widely accepted ship design of the late 1880s, designed by Alexander McDougall. A Scottish immigrant, Great Lakes captain, inventor and entrepreneur, McDougall developed the idea of the whaleback as a way to improve the ability of barges to follow a towing vessel in heavy seas. Whalebacks were characterized by distinctive hull shapes with rounded tops, lacking conventional vertical sides, and conoidal ends. Their rounded hulls enabled water to easily slide off their decks, minimising friction, and letting them sail quickly and smoothly through the water. Their superstructure was located on turrets mounted on the main deck. The rounded contours of whalebacks gave them an unconventional appearance, and McDougall's ship and barge designs were received with considerable skepticism, resistance, and derision. As they had porcine-looking snouts for bows, some observers called them "pig boats".

After McDougall was unable to persuade existing shipbuilders to try his designs, he founded the American Steel Barge Company in Superior, Wisconsin in 1888, and built them himself. McDougall actively promoted his design and company by sending the steamer Charles W. Wetmore to London, and starting another shipyard in Everett, Washington, which built the steamer City of Everett. Despite McDougall's further efforts to promote the design with the excursion liner Christopher Columbus, whalebacks never caught on, with only 44 of them being built.

=== Design and construction ===
Drawings of 104 published in the Scientific American on July 4, 1891

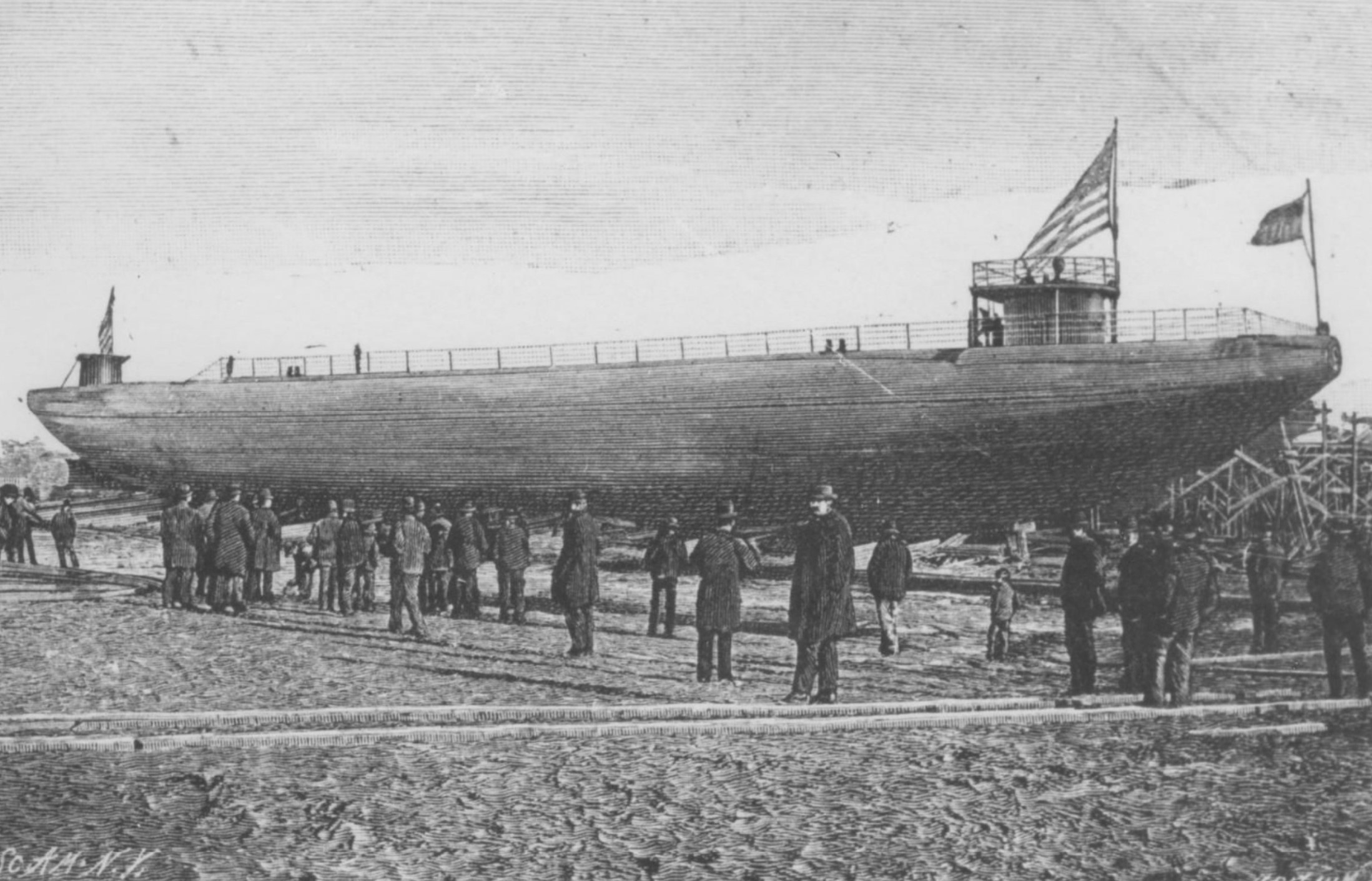
104 on the ways

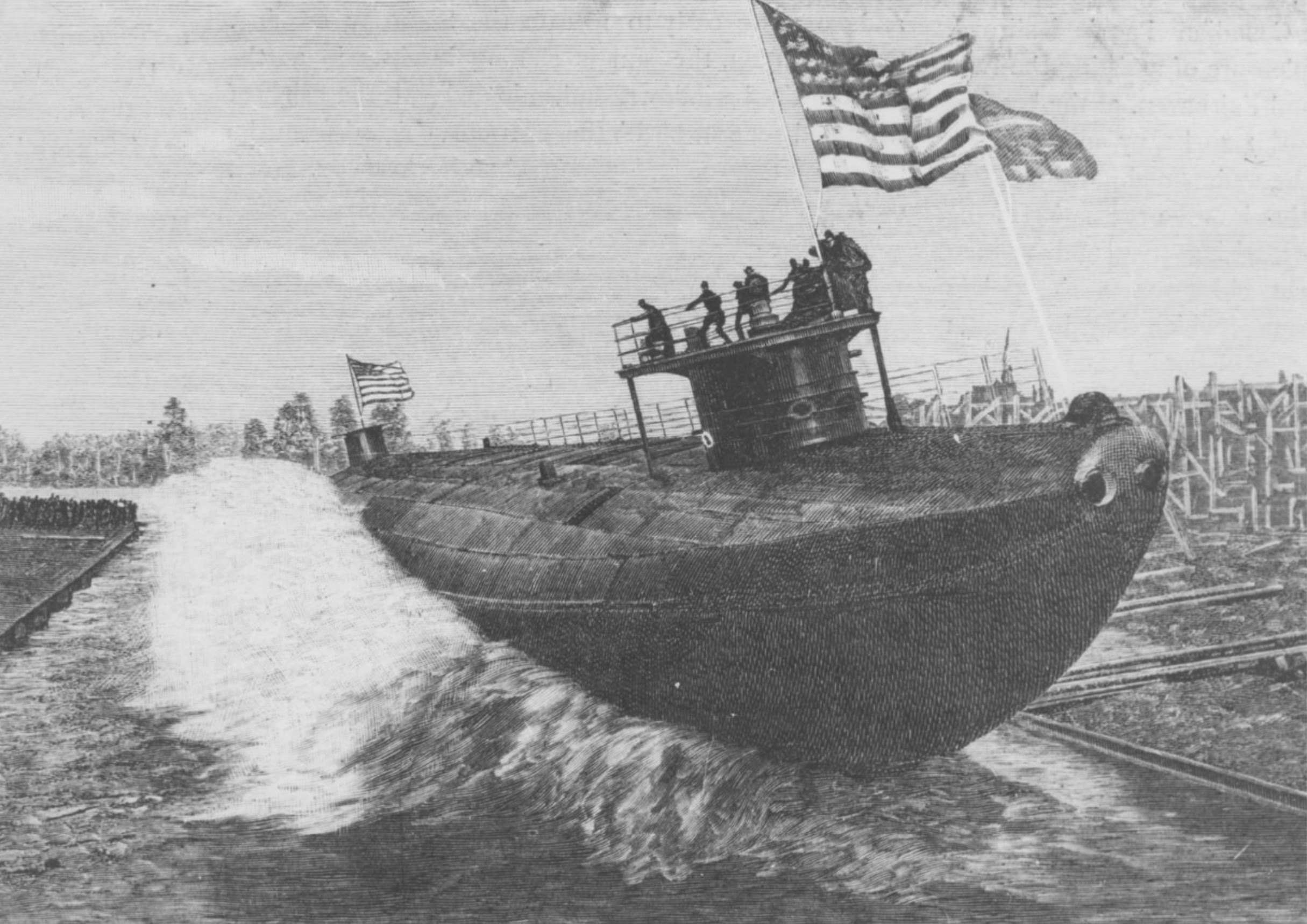
Launch of 104

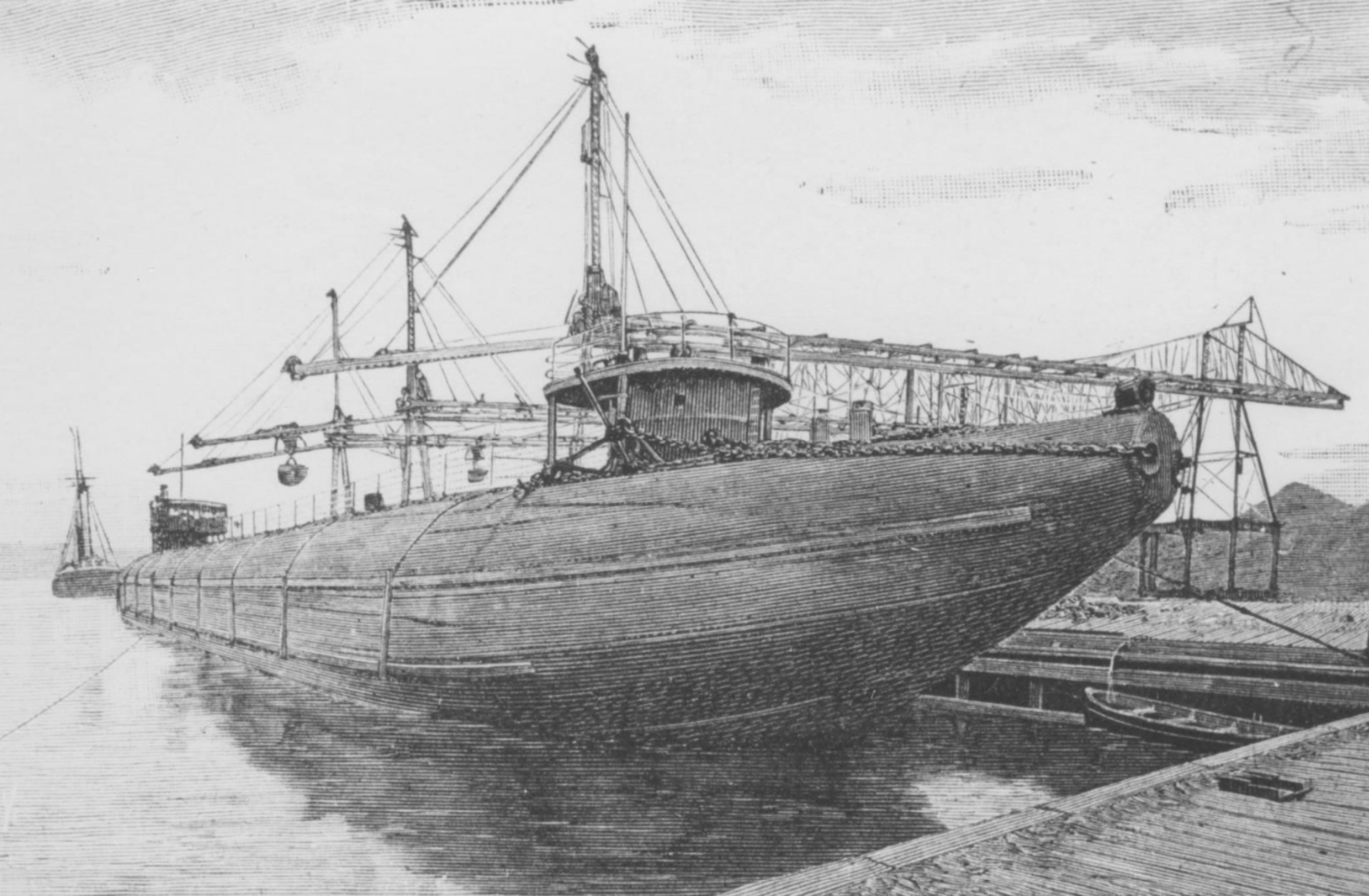
104 at a dock

104 (also known as Barge 104, or No.104) was constructed between October 1889 and February 1890 in Duluth, Minnesota by the American Steel Barge Company. Her first hull frames were laid down on October 23, 1889. 104 was launched on February 6, 1890, becoming the fourth whaleback built by Alexander McDougall's company. 104 was identical to 105 and 107, launched in April 1890 in Duluth, and August 1890 in Superior, Wisconsin, respectively. She had an overall length of 288 feet (87.8 m) (length between perpendiculars of 276.5 feet (84.3 m) or 276 feet (84.1 m)). Her hull was 36.1 feet (11.0 m) (or 36 feet (11.0 m)) wide, and 18.9 feet (5.8 m) (or 19 feet (5.8 m)) deep. 104 had a gross tonnage of 1,295 (or 1,295.44, tons) tons, and a net tonnage of 1,230 (some sources state 1,230.69, or 1,231) tons. She had a cargo carrying capacity of 3,300 tons. 104 was an unrigged barge, and was towed by a steam-powered ship.

=== Service history ===
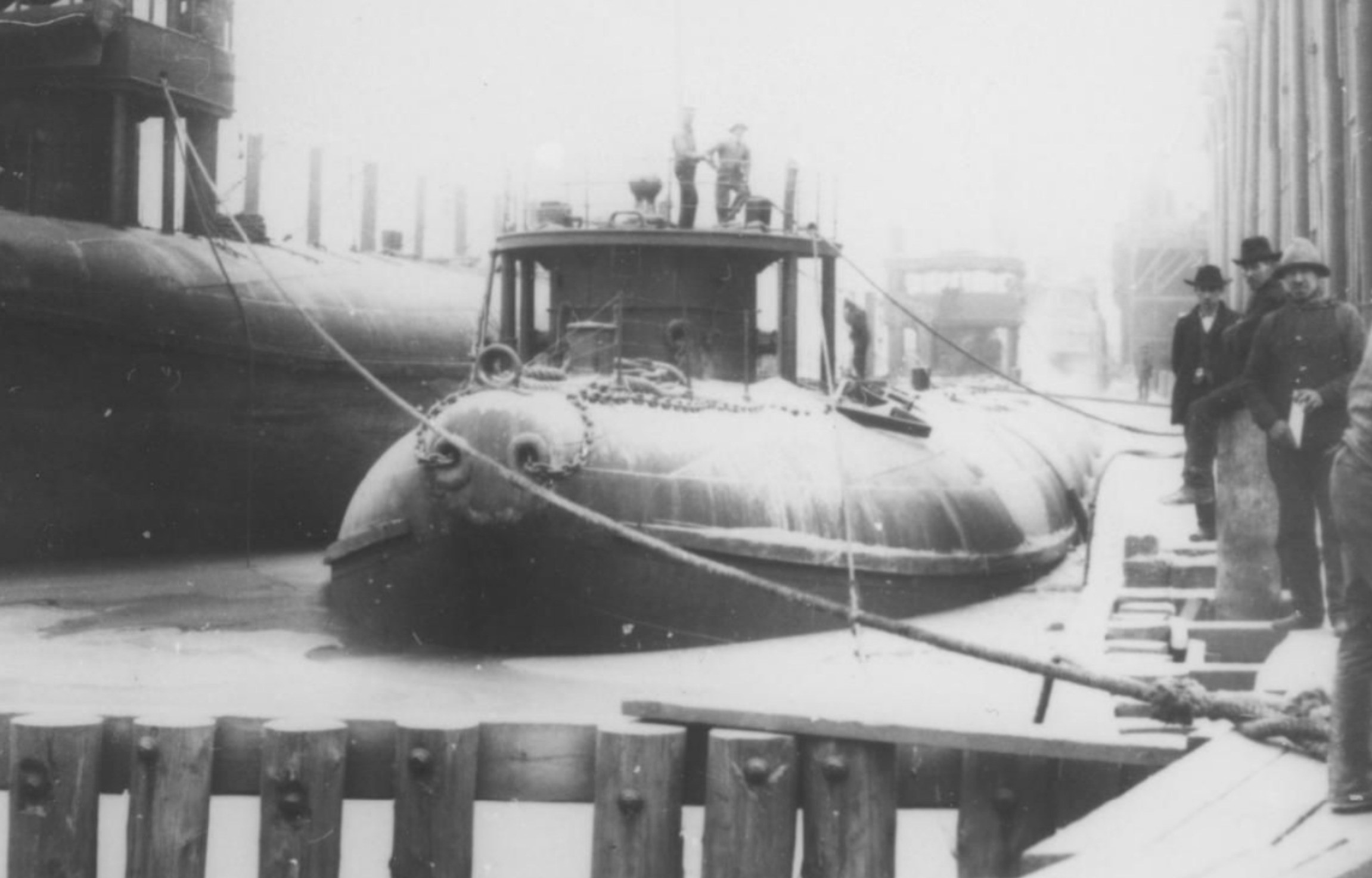
104 from a different angle

104 was built by the American Steel Barge Company for the fleet of the same name based in Buffalo, New York. She was enrolled in Duluth, Minnesota, on April 12, 1890, and was given the US official number #53257. Her home port was Buffalo. 104 entered service on April 21, carrying iron ore from Two Harbors, Minnesota. In 1895, management of the American Steel Barge Company fleet was taken over by Pickands Mather & Company of Cleveland, Ohio.

On April 24, 1896, while upbound, in tow of the whaleback freighter A.D. Thompson in the Detroit River near a coal dock in Detroit, Michigan, 104 was struck amidships, near the waterline by the wooden bulk freighter Philip Minch. A.D. Thompson and 104 proceeded up the Detroit River, as 104 did not immediately begin to fill with water, and her pumps kept her dry. However, as the two vessels entered Lake St. Clair, 104's pumps could no longer keep up with the influx of water, causing her to sink into 16 feet (4.9 m) (or 17 feet (5.2 m)) of water. The wrecking tug Saginaw, equipped with a steam pump, was immediately dispatched to pump 104 dry.

On June 8, 1896, 104 and the whaleback barge 134 broke away from the whaleback freighter James B. Colgate in a storm. As neither of them had enough time to drop anchors in order to avoid grounding, both of them ran aground on Chequamegon Point. 104 and 134 were found to be aground in 2 feet (0.6 m) of water, embedded in sand and intact. They were released by James B. Colgate and the tugs B.B. Inman and J.W. Ward.

=== Final voyage ===
Late in the evening on November 10, 1898, 104, with 7 crewmen on board, was being towed out of Cleveland harbour by the tug Alva B. in a heavy storm. She was loaded with a cargo of coal bound for Duluth, Minnesota. Due to the heavy seas, 104 broke away from Alva B., and crashed into Cleveland's west breakwater, approximately 0.5 miles (0.8 km) northwest of the Cleveland United States Life-Saving Service. After pounding against the breakwater, 104 rapidly sank. Cleveland United States Life-Saving Service were notified of 104's situation, arriving at the scene with a lifeboat. The poor weather prevented the rescuers from throwing a line to 104. Instead, they maneuvered their life boat inside the breakwater. Using ropes and heaving sticks, the rescuers managed to remove 104's crew, and put them on the breakwater. There were no injuries, or loss of life in the wreck. 104's enrollment surrendered on January 14, 1899, in Buffalo, New York. An article published on November 14, in The Times Herald of Port Huron, Michigan reported that 104 had already broken up. She was a total loss, becoming the first whaleback to be lost on the Great Lakes. (Note: In total, eight whalebacks wrecked on the Great Lakes. Four of them 104, 115, Sagamore and 129 were barges, while a further four, Thomas Wilson, James B. Colgate, Clifton and Henry Cort were steam powered.)

== Sources ==
- About the Great Lakes (2007). "Remember the Whaleback Steamers". About the Great Lakes. Archived from the original on October 5, 2007.
- Alpena County George N. Fletcher Public Library (1) (2021). "104 (1890, Barge)". Alpena, Michigan: Alpena County George N. Fletcher Public Library.
- Alpena County George N. Fletcher Public Library (2) (2021). "Ward, J.W. (1891, Tug (Towboat))". Alpena, Michigan: Alpena County George N. Fletcher Public Library.
- Alpena County George N. Fletcher Public Library (3) (2021). "Inman, B.B. (1892, Tug (Towboat))". Alpena, Michigan: Alpena County George N. Fletcher Public Library.
- Berry (1), Sterling (2021). "104". Detroit, Michigan: Great Lakes Vessel Histories of Sterling Berry.
- Berry (2), Sterling (2021). "105". Detroit, Michigan: Great Lakes Vessel Histories of Sterling Berry.
- Berry (3), Sterling (2021). "107". Detroit, Michigan: Great Lakes Vessel Histories of Sterling Berry.
- Bowling Green State University (1) (2021). "0104". Bowling Green, Ohio: Bowling Green State University.
- Bowling Green State University (2) (2021). "0105". Bowling Green, Ohio: Bowling Green State University.
- Bowling Green State University (3) (2021). "0107". Bowling Green, Ohio: Bowling Green State University.
- Croil, James (1998). Steam Navigation and Its Relation to the Commerce of Canada and the United States. Toronto, Ontario: Montreal News Company. pp. 362–64. OCLC 1082014. Google books has images of those pages in the chapter entitled The Turret Steamship
- Duerkop, John (2007). "Some Marine Terminology". Research Resources (definition 65, "Whaleback". Kingston, Ontario: Marine Museum of the Great Lakes at Kingston. Archived from the original on March 11, 2008.
- Ebeling, Charles W. (2001). "You Call That Damn Thing a Boat?". American Heritage of Invention & Technology. 17 (2). American Heritage Publishing. ISSN 8756-7296. OCLC 11638224. Archived from the original on September 29, 2007.
- Leonard, John (1983). "A Whaleback Quiz". Toronto, Ontario: Toronto Marine Historical Society.
- Maritime History of the Great Lakes (1890). "104 (Barge), U53257, 8 Feb 1890". Ontario, Canada: Maritime History of the Great Lakes.
- Maritime History of the Great Lakes (1) (1896). "104 (Barge), U53257, sunk by collision, 24 Apr 1896". Ontario, Canada: Maritime History of the Great Lakes.
- Maritime History of the Great Lakes (2) (1896). "No. 104 (Barge), U53257, aground, 8 Jun 1896". Ontario, Canada: Maritime History of the Great Lakes.
- Maritime History of the Great Lakes (1898). "No. 104 (Barge), U53257, aground, 10 Nov 1898". Ontario, Canada: Maritime History of the Great Lakes.
- Minnesota Historical Society (2008). "Thomas Wilson - Whaleback freighters". Saint Paul, Minnesota: Minnesota Historical Society.
- Oakley, Janet (2005). "Charles W. Wetmore arrives". Washington, United States: Washington State online history encyclopedia.
- Scientific American (1891). "The McDougall Steel Whaleback Vessel". New York City: Scientific American – via Alamy.
- Swayze, David (2001). "Great Lakes Shipwrecks - B". Port Huron, Michigan: Boatnerd. Archived from the original on January 27, 2021.
- Toronto Marine Historical Society (2000). "Ship of the Month No.260". Toronto, Ontario: Toronto Marine Historical Society.
- Zoss, Neel R. (2007). McDougall's Great Lakes Whalebacks. Charleston, South Carolina: Arcadia Publishing. ISBN 978-0-7385-5143-2.
