= SS Henry Cort =

Great Lakes whaleback freighter

Coordinates: 43.227167°N 86.345617°W

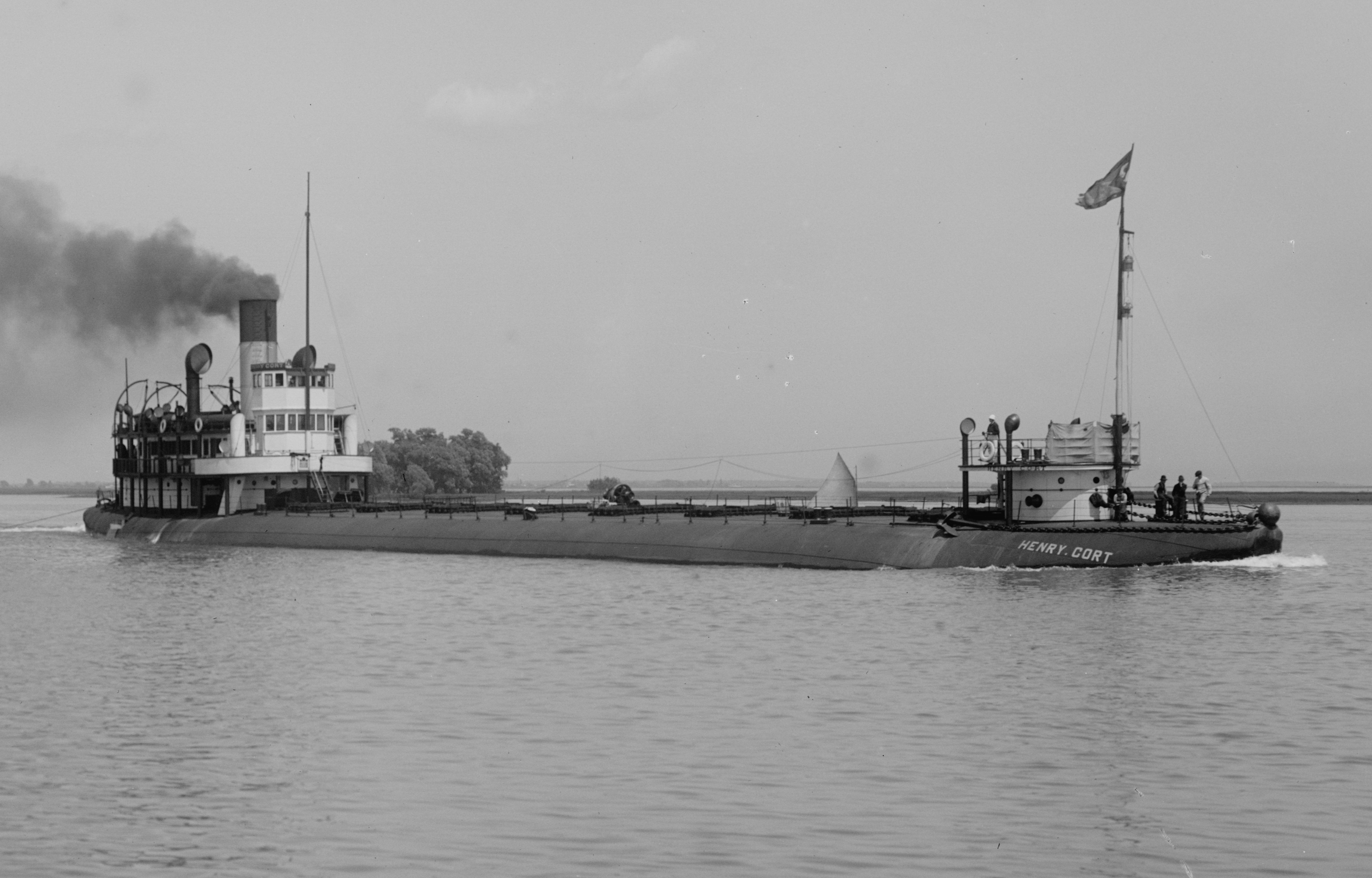
- Henry Cort underway

History

United States
- Name: Pillsbury (1892-1896) Henry Cort (1896-1934)
- Namesake: Henry Cort
- Operator: St. Paul & Buffalo Steamship Company (1892-1896); Bessemer Steamship Company (1896-1901); Pittsburgh Steamship Company (1901-1930); Lakesport Shipping & Navigation Company (1930-1934)
- Port of registry: United States
- Builder: American Steel Barge Company, Superior, Wisconsin
- Yard number: 125
- Completed: 1892
- In service: 1892
- Out of service: 1934
- Identification: U.S. Registry #150587
- Fate: Ran aground after hitting the Muskegon breakwall on 30 November 1934

General characteristics
- Class & type: Whaleback Freighter
- Tonnage: 2234.49 gross register tons; 1571.65 net register tons
- Length: 320 ft (98 m)
- Beam: 38 ft (12 m)
- Height: 24 ft (7.3 m)
- Draft: 7.3 m
- Installed power: 2 x Scotch marine boilers
- Propulsion: Triple expansion steam engine
- Speed: 15 knots
- Crew: 25

SS Henry Cort was a 320-foot (98 m) long whaleback freighter. It sank four times during its career; finally running aground at Muskegon, Michigan in November, 1934. The ship broke apart over the winter and was scrapped in 1935.

== History ==
=== Construction ===
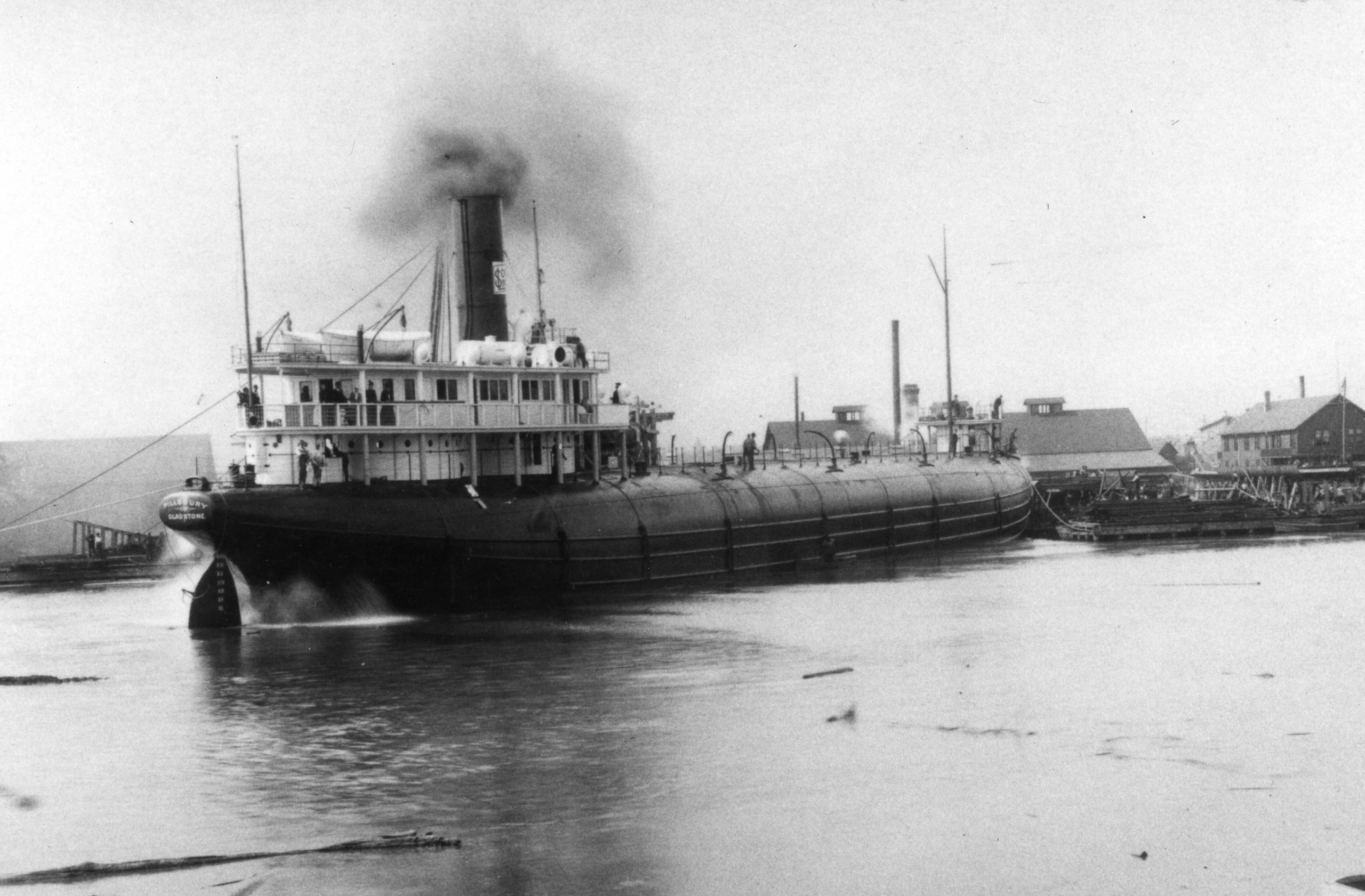
Stern view of the Henry Cort

The Henry Cort was built by the American Steel Barge Company. Her first frames were laid down on January 4, 1892 and, on June 25, 1892, she was launched as hull number #125. She had an overall length of 335 feet (102 m), and she was 320 feet (98 m) between her perpendiculars, she had a beam of 42 feet (13 m) and her cargo hold was 25 feet (7.6 m) deep. She had a gross register tonnage of 2234.49 tons and she had a net register tonnage of 1571.65 tons. She was powered by a 1,400 horsepower triple expansion engine which was fueled by two coal-fired Scotch marine boilers.

Designed by Captain Alexander McDougall to carry bulk cargoes like iron ore or grain economically around the Great Lakes. Whalebacks had a rather unique design. They had an unusual cylindrical, cigar shaped hull that when fully loaded resembled a whale's back. Their hulls were built of heavy steel plates double-riveted to steel angle frames. They were the predecessors of the Doxford turret deck ships of the late 19th and early 20th century, just like whalebacks they had a rounded hull, but unlike whalebacks they had a conventional bow, stern and superstructure. A total of 44 whaleback vessels were constructed from 1888 to 1898, with most operating in the Great Lakes. (Note: Charles W. Wetmore was the first whaleback to leave the lakes in June, 1891, sailing to London and from there to the west coast of the United States, where it grounded and became a total loss. The City of Everett was a significant whaleback steamer. She was constructed in the State of Washington, sailed from her construction in 1894 until her sinking in 1923, and was the first U.S. steamship to pass through the Suez Canal as well as the first to circumnavigate the globe.)

=== Service history ===
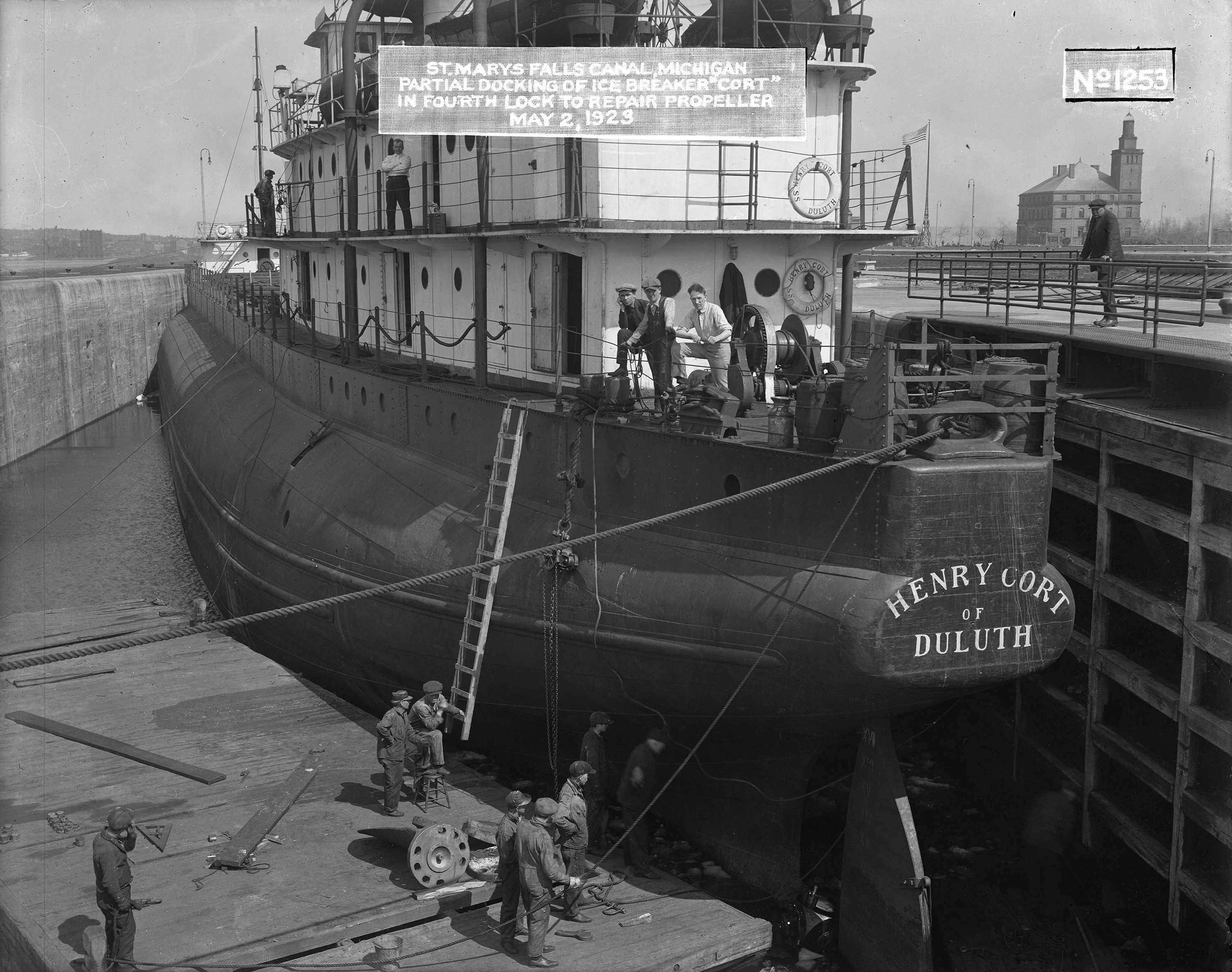
The whaleback Henry Cort showing off her new trunk deck

The Pillsbury entered service on August 17, 1892. She was commissioned by the Minneapolis, St. Paul & Buffalo Steamship Company which was a subsidiary of the Minneapolis, St. Paul & Sault Ste. Marie Railway or the Soo Line. Her homeport was Marquette, Michigan. In 1896 the Pillsbury was renamed Henry Cort

On December 17, 1917, the Cort was breaking ice near Colchester Reef on Lake Erie when she was rammed by the larger steel freighter Midvale. She sank into thirty feet of water approximately 4½ miles from Colchester Reef. Her crew walked across the ice to the Midvale. Her wreck was located on April 24, 1918 four miles from where she sank in seven feet of water. She was raised on September 22, 1918, the fourth attempt at raising her was successful, she was then towed to Toledo, Ohio where she was to be rebuilt by the Toledo Shipbuilding Company. Later she was taken to Conneaut, Ohio where she was rebuilt by the Pittsburgh & Conneaut Dock Company; her superstructure was rebuilt and flattened so that a trunk deck could be added. On April 8, 1927, the Cort was sold to the Lake Ports Shipping & Navigation Company of Detroit, Michigan, she also had two new deck cranes installed by the American Ship Building Company of Lorain, Ohio. In March 1927 the Cort stranded in Colchester Reef. She was abandoned to the underwriters as a constructive total loss, she was later sold and repaired. In 1933 the Cort's hull was punctured by ice in the Detroit River; she sank while she was tied up at the Nicholson Transit Company's dock in Ecorse, Michigan.

== Final voyage ==
On 30 November 1934, Henry Cort ran aground, hitting the north side of the Muskegon channel breakwater in Muskegon after encountering a gale with up to 45 mph winds. The US Coast Guard cutter Escanaba that went to investigate the stricken steamer helped all 25 crew members to safety. One of the Coast Guard crew members died after being washed overboard. Many people on shore watched as the Coast Guard shot a line to the Cort and all members of the crew climbed down from the ship. The ship was broken in two by December storms, and was declared a total loss. The vessel was scrapped in 1935.
