= Charles Wetmore =

Charles Wetmore may refer to:

- Charles Wetmore (winemaker), American vintner and founder of Cresta Blanca Winery
- Charles D. Wetmore, partner of architectural firm Warren and Wetmore
- SS Charles W. Wetmore, a whaleback freighter
