= Augustus B. Wolvin =

American shipping magnate

Augustus Benjamin Wolvin
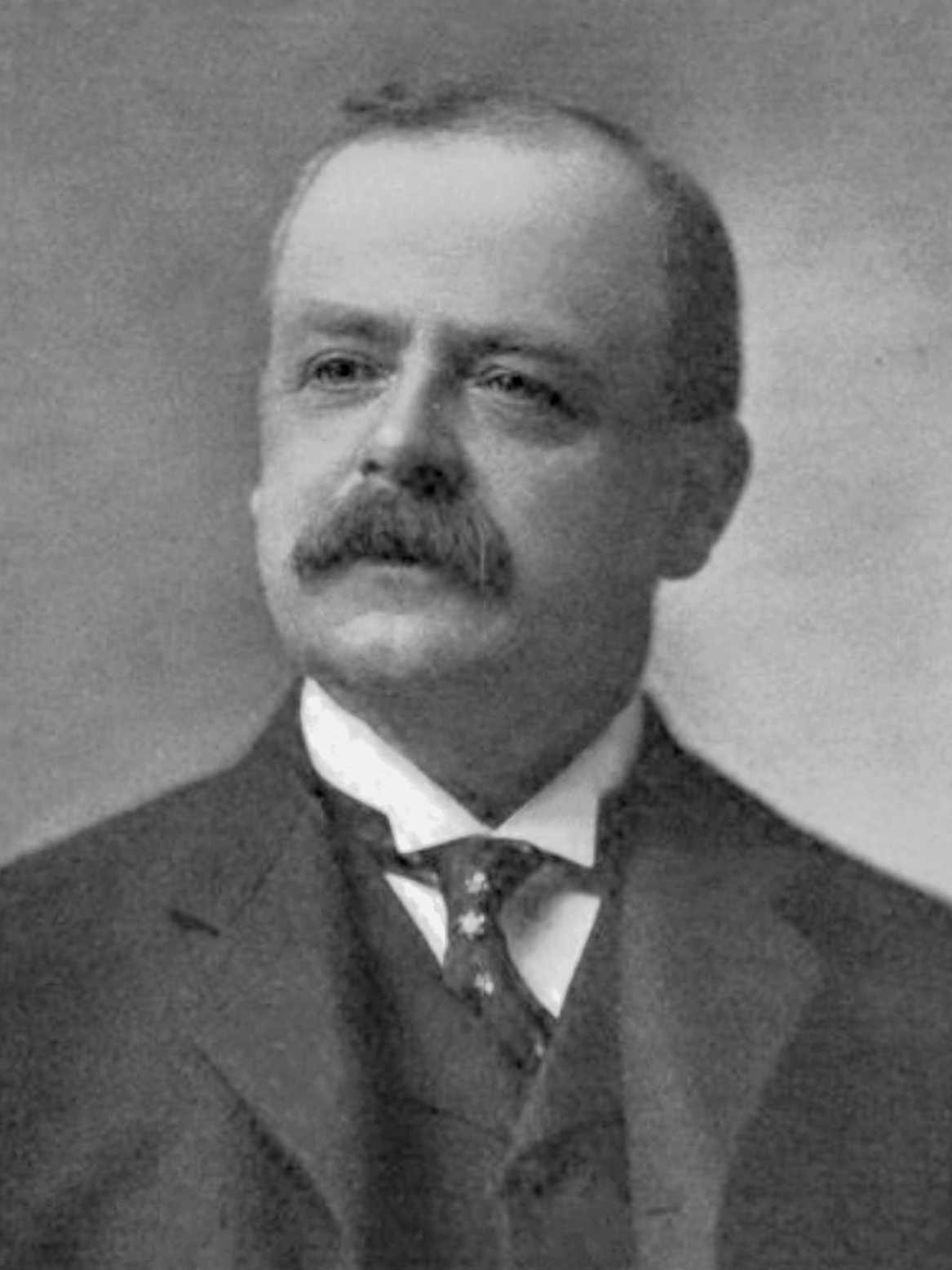
- Born: October 16, 1857; Cleveland, Ohio, US
- Died: March 31, 1932 (aged 74); Duluth, Minnesota, US
- Other names: Gus Wolvin
- Occupation: Ships' captain
- Known for: Founded several shipping firms

Augustus Benjamin Wolvin (1857-1932) was an American shipping magnate. He founded several Great Lakes shipping firms.

Wolvin's father was a ships' captain on the Great Lakes, and started serving on his father's vessels when he was ten years old. Wolvin became a ships' captain himself, when he was 21 years old. One of the vessels he commanded was the Dean Richmond. Wolvin's parents died in 1883, when he was 26. He and his wife took over raising his younger siblings and he retired from serving as a captain, and worked as a produce merchant in Pecatonica. In 1888, when his younger siblings were on their own, he and his wife moved to Duluth, Minnesota, where he founded LaSalle and Wolvin a shipping agent firm.

In 1995 Wolvin was encouraged by James Henry Hoyt a representative of American Steel and Wire Company encouraged Wolvin to use his experience in shipping to assemble and manage a fleet of vessels to serve the mining industry. Wolvin was the founding President of the Empire Transportation Company, and Hoyt was the founding Secretary. Its first vessel was the W.H. Gilbert. Wolvin founded the Zenith Transit Company. His firm built the Zenith City, Victory, Empire City, Crescent City and Superior City.

In 1896 Wolvin and other Duluth business men acquired the financially troubled Inman Towing Company.
