= 101 (barge) =

American ship

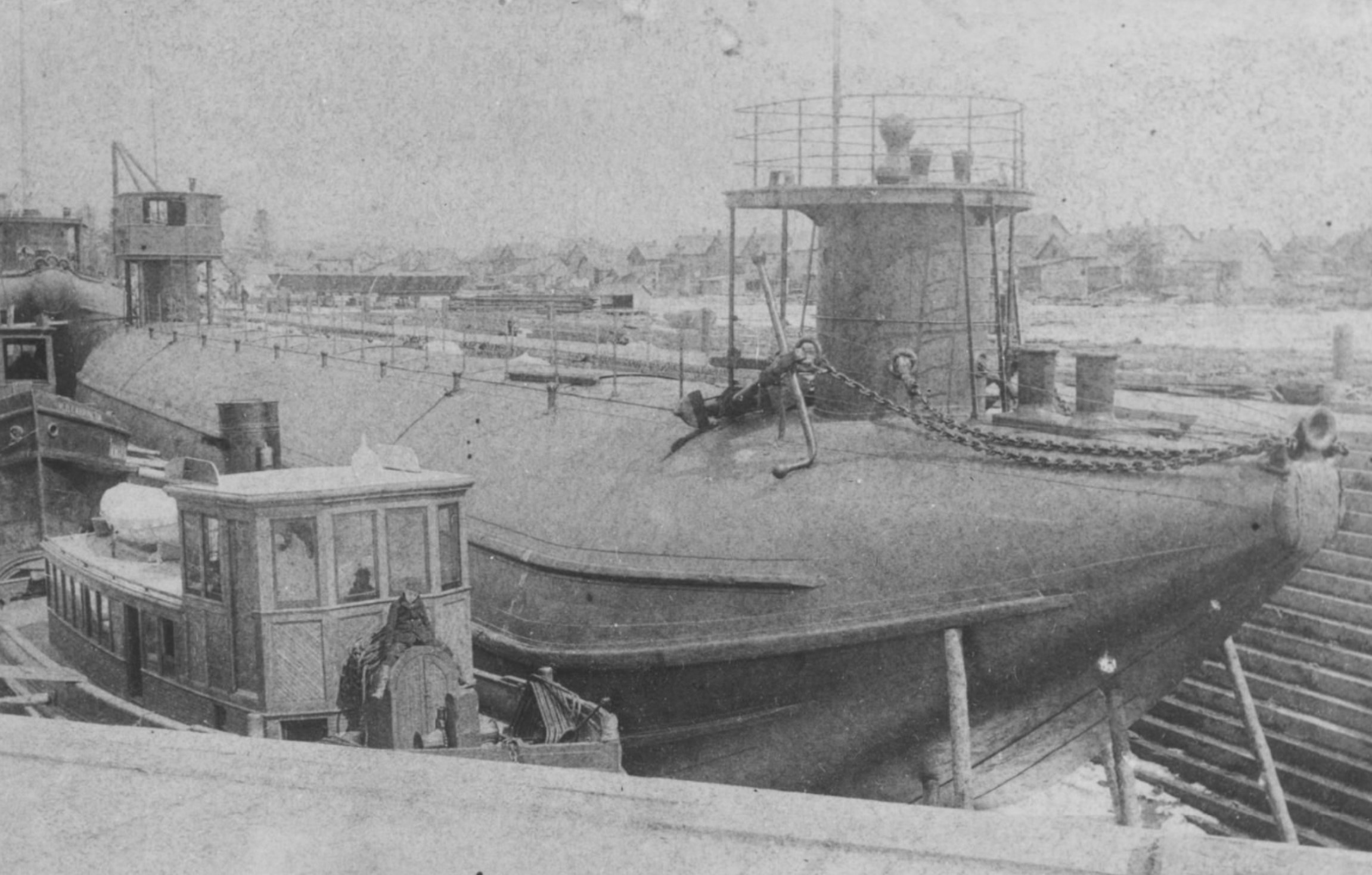
- Whaleback Barge 101

History

United States
- Name: Whaleback Barge 101
- Owner: Alexander McDougall
- Port of registry: United States, Duluth, Minnesota
- Builder: American Steel Barge Company, Duluth, Minnesota
- Yard number: 101
- Launched: June 23, 1888
- In service: 1888
- Out of service: December 3, 1908
- Identification: U.S. Registry #53249
- Fate: Lost with all hands 30 miles off Seal Island in the Atlantic Ocean
- Notes: First Whaleback ever built

General characteristics
- Class & type: Barge
- Tonnage: 428.30 gross 412.32 net
- Length: 178 ft (54 m)
- Beam: 25.1 ft (7.7 m)
- Height: 12.7 ft (3.9 m)
- Propulsion: Towed by a steam-powered freighter
- Capacity: 1,200 tons
- Crew: 7

101 was an American whaleback barge that was usually towed by a steam driven freighter or a tugboat. She was significant as she was the first whaleback freighter ever built. She had a length of 178-feet a beam of 25.1 feet, and a depth of 12.7 feet.

== History ==
Whaleback Barge 101 was built by the American Steel Barge Company of Duluth, Minnesota, while her cylindrical bow and her stern was built by Pusey & Jones Shipbuilding Company of Wilmington, Delaware. She was launched as hull #101 on June 23, 1888. There is a story that as Barge 101 was being launched in Duluth, McDougall's wife Emmelin said to her sister in law, "There goes our last dollar". This was because McDougall had trouble finding investors for this unusual ship. With no investors, he had to spend his own money on building and financing the building of these vessels.

In 1889, Barge 101 was lengthened by the American Steel Barge Company of Superior, Wisconsin to 191-feet in length. She grounded at Lime Kiln, near Detroit in April 1892, and immediately was filled with water. Workers started raising her shortly after the incident.

In 1903 she was sold to the Barret Manufacturing Company for ocean service. In 1906 she was purchased by the Coast Transit Company of New Jersey. On December 3, 1908 Barge 101 was in the tow of the tugboat John Hughes when she was lost with all hands 30 miles north of Seal Island. She was bound for Halifax, Nova Scotia with a cargo of tar at the time of the loss.
