= Empire Transportation Company =

- Founded: 1865
- Founder: Joseph D. Potts
- Defunct: 1877
- Fate: Sold
- Parent: Pennsylvania Railroad

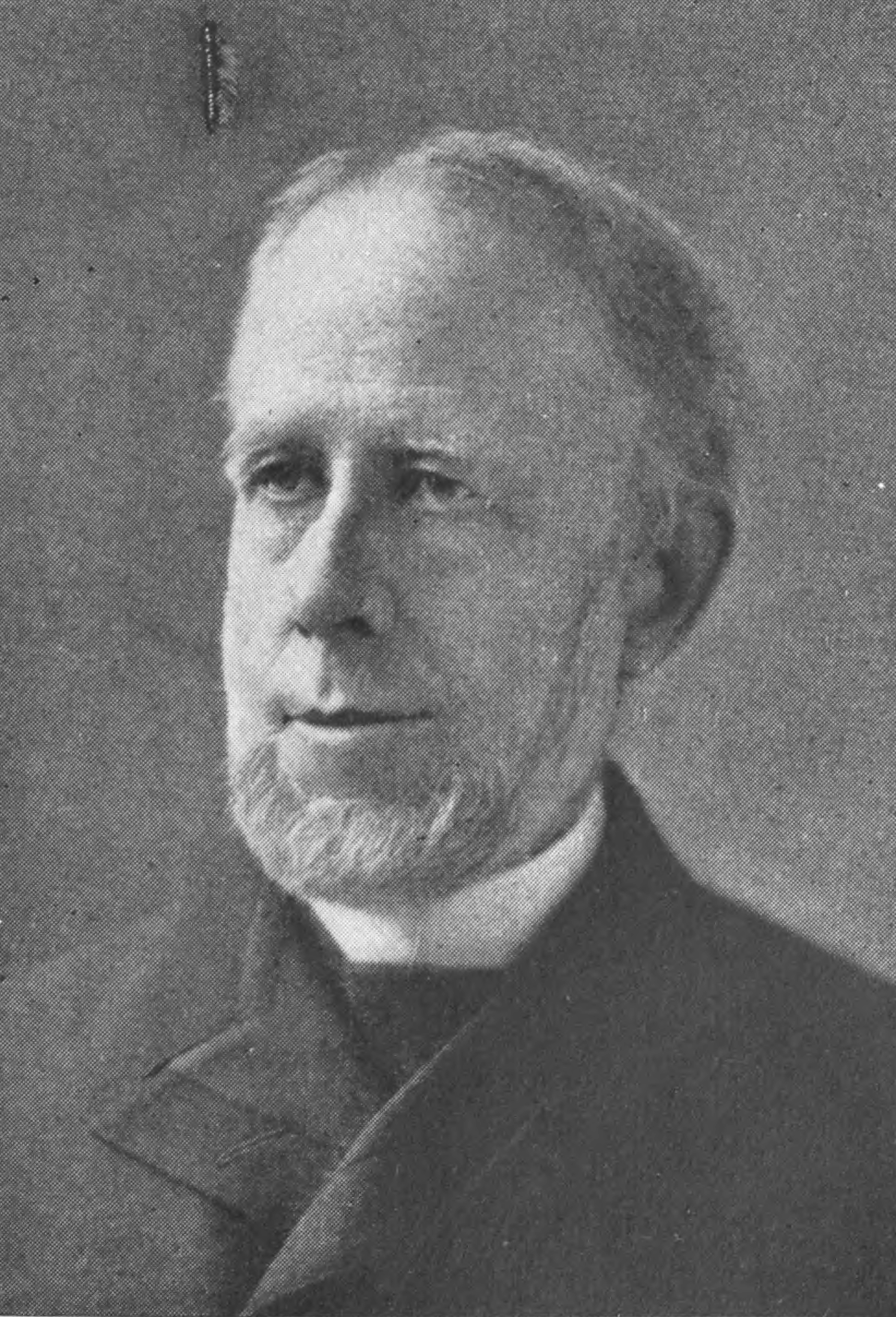
Joseph D. Potts

The Empire Transportation Company was a multimodal freight transportation company founded and operated by Joseph D. Potts in 1865.

== Overview ==
The company owned a small fleet of boats on the Great Lakes which collected grain and produce which were then delivered to Erie, Pennsylvania. It owned 5,000 railroad cars, 1,500 of which were tank cars devoted to carrying oil. It also owned 520 miles of oil pipelines. By the mid-1870s, it hauled about 3,000,000 barrels of oil annually, of which about two-thirds came from independent oil refiners.

The company was a subsidiary of the Pennsylvania Railroad and it was very profitable. In 1876 the company paid a 10 percent dividend ($400,000) on stock worth $4,000,000.

== Venture ==
Many of Potts' oil tanker customers were independent refiners, and he became worried that his business would become subservient to Standard Oil. In 1877, Potts bought an oil refinery on Long Island and began to build one in Philadelphia. John D. Rockefeller of Standard Oil visited with Thomas A. Scott, the president of the Pennsylvania Railroad to object having a competitor in the refining business, even though Scott knew that Standard Oil owned at least twice as many tank cars that the Empire Transportation Company owned. Following this meeting, Standard Oil shut down its Pittsburgh refineries in March 1877, depriving the Pennsylvania Railroad of 65 percent of its oil traffic.

A strike in July 1877 destroyed millions of dollars of Pennsylvania Railroad property. In discussions that largely excluded Potts, A.J. Cassatt of the Pennsylvania Railroad and Standard Oil agreed to a sale price of $3,500,000 in October 1877.

== Bibliography ==
- Hawke, David Freeman (1980). John D. The Founding Father of the Rockefellers. Harper & Row. ISBN 978-0060118136.
