= James B. Colgate (ship) =

Whaleback steamer

Coordinates: 42°5′22.6788″N 81°44′16.8612″W

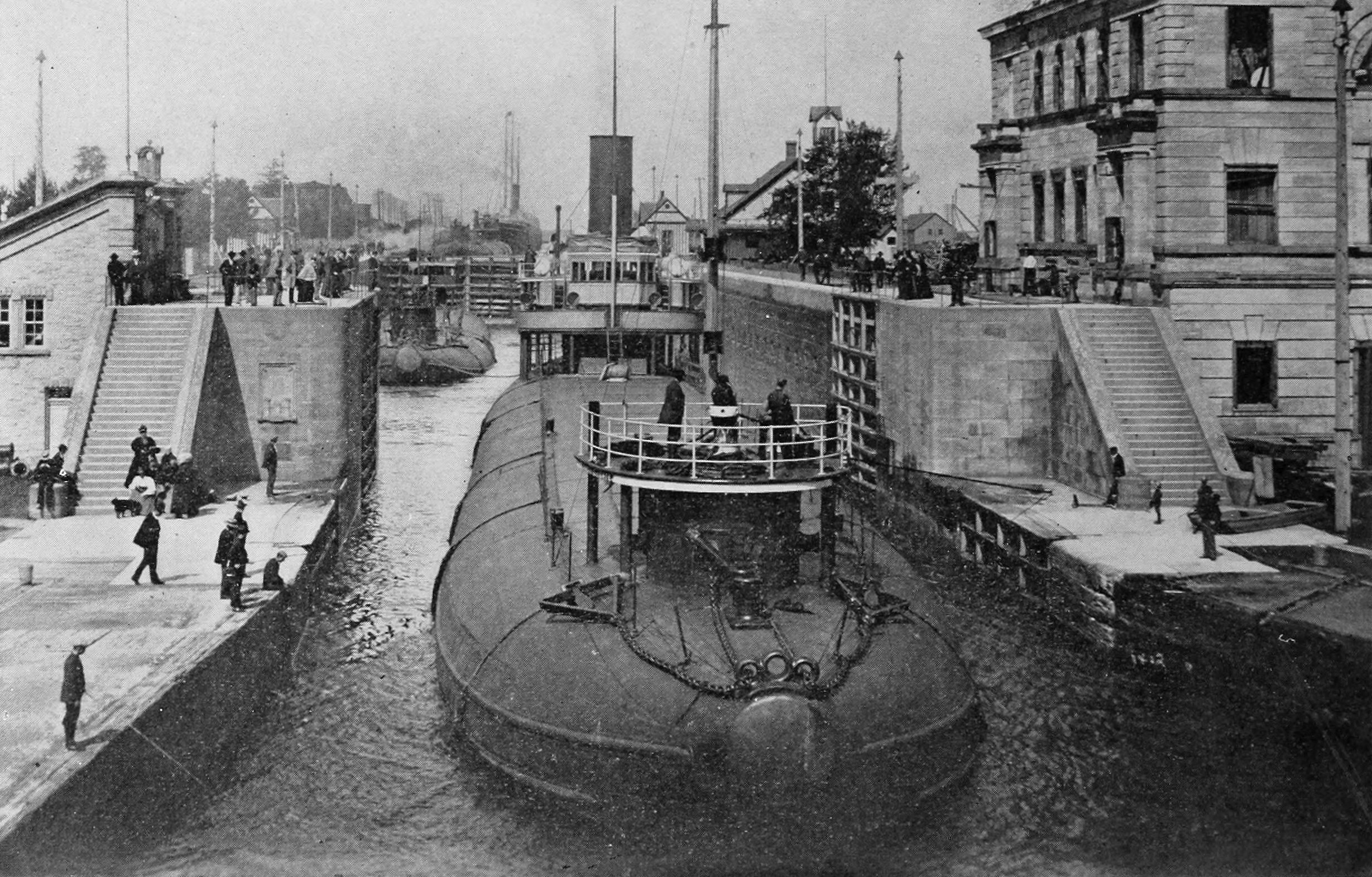
- The James B. Colgate underway

History

United States
- Name: James B. Colgate
- Owner: Pittsburgh Steamship Company
- Completed: 1892
- Maiden voyage: 21 September 1892
- Fate: Sunk in storm, 20 October 1916

General characteristics
- Type: Whaleback freighter
- Tonnage: 1,713
- Length: 308 ft (94 m)
- Beam: 38 ft (12 m)
- Height: 24 ft (7.3 m)
- Crew: 26

James B. Colgate was a whaleback steamer that sank off the shores of Long Point, Ontario, Canada, in Lake Erie on 20 October 1916. This day was dubbed "Black Friday" because of its fierce winds and towering waves wreaking havoc on numerous vessels traveling on Lake Erie's waters. The James B. Colgate, loaded with coal, left on its final voyage from Buffalo, New York, heading for Fort William, Ontario today known as Thunder Bay. The vessel had a tonnage of 1,713 tons and measured 308 feet (94 m) in length. Captain Walter Grashaw was the only surviving member of the 26-man crew.

== History ==
The American Steel Barge Company built the James B. Colgate in West Superior, Wisconsin in 1892. The Pittsburgh Steamship Company owned the James B. Colgate, using the vessel to ship goods throughout the Great Lakes region. Her maiden voyage occurred on 21 September 1892, surviving 24 years and overcoming numerous storms. The ship's longevity and durability accentuates the strength of the storm that eventually led to her ruin.

Three other ships met their demise on this day. The D.L. Filer, Marshall F. Butters, and Merida all succumbed to the storm, one of the worst Lake Erie had ever endured. After hours of hurricane-like winds pounding on the ship, the James B. Colgate was unable to stay afloat, eventually plummeting bow first to the bottom of the lake. She sank because of the amount of water pouring into the cargo hold, too much for the pumps to empty. The crew knew the ship was in peril but had no means of communication to send a distress signal.

Captain Grashaw was the only survivor of this shipwreck. He had been aboard the James B. Colgate for 10 years as first shipmate; this was his first voyage as captain. The ship was only fitted with one lifeboat, forcing the crew to rely heavily on life preservers to save their lives. The ferocity of the storm negated the life-saving aspect of the preserver, resulting in the drowning of the entire crew, except the captain. After a time in the water, Captain Grashaw found a life raft with two other men on it, one was Harvey Ossman, second engineer, the night was too dark for the Captain to recognize the third man. The three men struggled to stay aboard the tiny raft as it was tossed by the waves through the night. By morning, Captain Grashaw was the only man to survive. After numerous hours, the captain finally spotted a passenger boat. His hope of rescue was quickly deflated, as the boat did not see or hear him crying for help. It was not until dawn on Sunday morning that a half-dead captain found refuge from the car ferry Marquette and Bessemer No.2 II. Captain Grashaw was one of the few survivors to tell the story of "Black Friday". Throughout the remainder of his life, he suffered with the guilt of losing his entire crew.

In 1991, offshore of Erieau, Ontario, the wreck of the James B. Colgate was finally located.
