= SS City of Everett =

American whaleback steamship

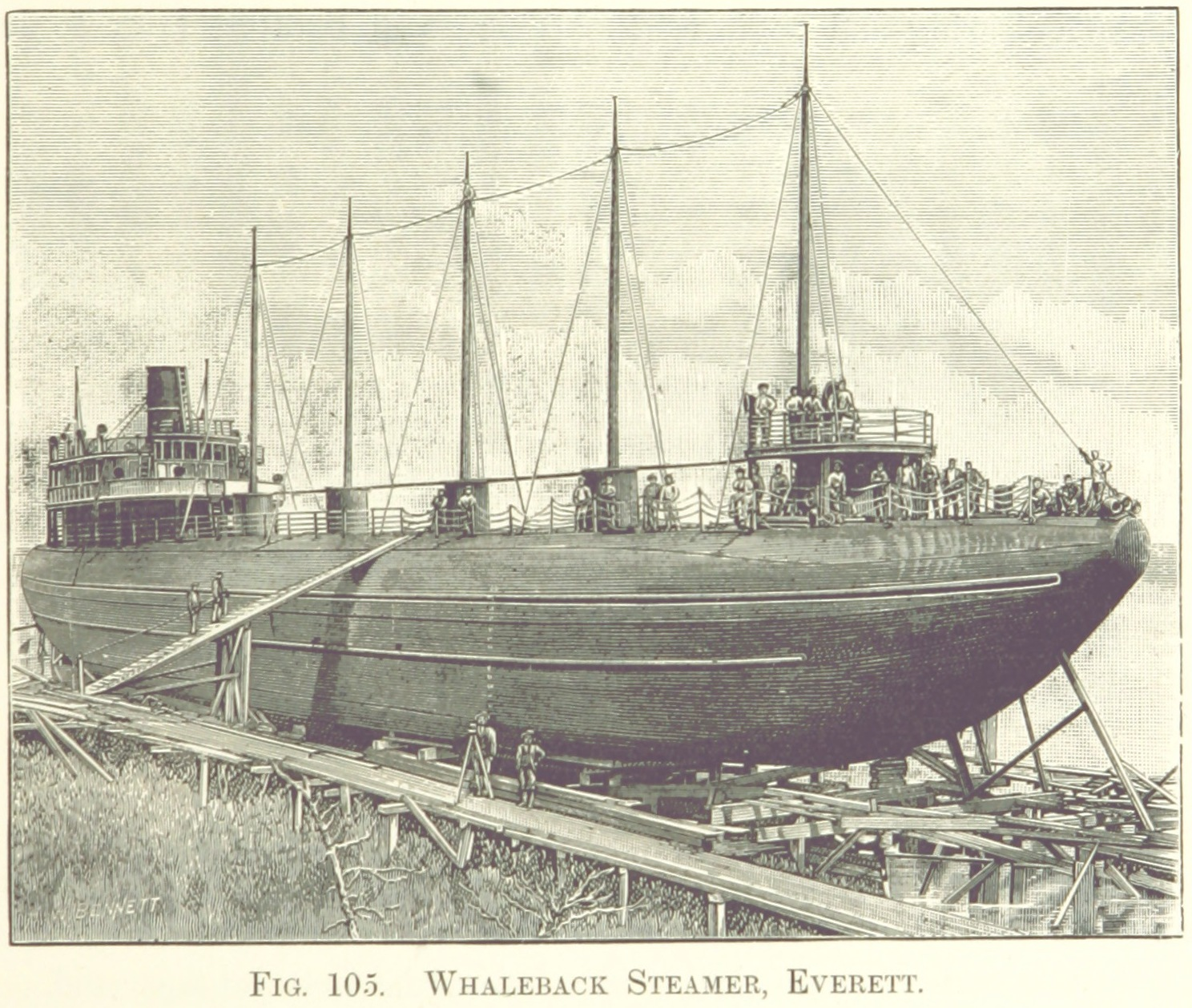
- The City of Everett under construction

History

United States
- Name: City of Everett
- Builder: Everett Shipyards
- Launched: 1894
- Out of service: 1923
- Fate: foundered in Gulf of Mexico 1923

General characteristics
- Length: 346 ft (105 m)
- Beam: 42 ft (13 m)
- Height: 13.58 ft (4.14 m)
- Notes: only whaleback to travel in the Suez Canal

SS City of Everett was an important whaleback steamship. She sailed from 1894 until 1923, and was the first U.S. steamship to pass through the Suez Canal, as well as the first to circumnavigate the globe. Her radio call letters were GF and her signal letters KMCQ.

== Origin ==
In the 1890s, Alexander McDougall, the originator of the whaleback ship design, wanted to build ships in Washington, on the Pacific Coast. His steamer SS Charles W. Wetmore (1891 – 265 ft) became the first lake vessel to leave the Great Lakes when she took a load of grain from Duluth to Liverpool, England, shooting the St. Lawrence rapids in the process. Wetmore was sent around Cape Horn with a load of supplies for the establishment of a shipbuilding colony near Everett, Washington. From parts she carried, the City of Everett was built, commissioned in 1894. Intended to be the first of a line of whaleback ships built out of the facility in Everett, changing fortunes resulted in her being the only ship produced there by McDougall's ill-fated company.

== Her career ==
The unarmed steamer "captured" the city of Málaga, Spain, when it entered the harbor seeking fresh water, which occasioned a surrender by the city's inhabitants during the Spanish–American War.

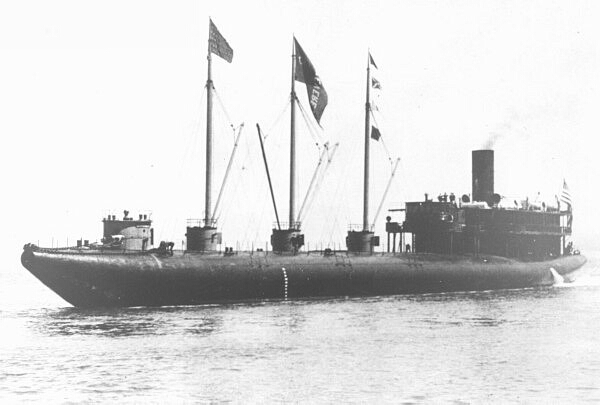
The City of Everett underway

On 8 September 1902, City of Everett suffered an explosion while loading at Port Arthur, Texas. Her captain, a mate, and several crew members were seriously injured; the resulting fire engulfed not only the ship, but also destroyed the docks and wharves of the Texas Company (later known as Texaco).

In January 1905, City of Everett collided with the Norwegian steam freighter Leif Eriksson north of Charleston, South Carolina. Leif Eriksson took on water through a deep gash in her hull, and sank in less than 10 minutes with the loss of two lives.

Near Nantucket on 23 January 1909, City of Everett heard a distress signal from the RMS Republic, which was taking on water following a collision. Captain Thomas Fenlon of the City of Everett twice offered his ship's considerable pumping and towing abilities, but with assistance reportedly on the way from the White Star Line, Republic declined. Fog delayed tugs of the White Star Line, and towing efforts by the smaller US Coast Guard cutter Gresham failed. Republic sank the next day. Newspapers at the time reported that if the White Star Line had been successful in recovering the Republic with company ships, instead of using a third-party salvor, it could have recouped some of its salvage expenses from the owners of the recovered cargo aboard the Republic. The inference was that Republic's captain had refused aid merely to prevent another company from sharing the salvage award if the ship were to be saved. Everett's Captain Fenlon maintained that, as Republic had remained afloat until the day after the collision, she could have been saved if she had accepted a tow from City of Everett, stating that his boat was "built for ocean towing" and was equipped with "tremendously powerful machinery and towing cables seven inches (178 mm) in diameter", as well as pumps with a capacity of "two million gallons an hour".

While carrying molasses from Santiago, Cuba to New Orleans on 11 October 1923, City of Everett foundered in the Gulf of Mexico. All 26 people on board died in the sinking.

== Search for the wreck of City of Everett ==
On September 11, 2010, divers from the Association of Underwater Explorers, Michael Barnette and Joe Citelli, believed they had identified the wreck of the City of Everett resting in approximately 400 feet (120 m) of sea water 120 nautical miles (220 km) off Florida in the Gulf of Mexico.

It was later discovered that this was in fact the steamer Munisla, identified by an engine plaque's serial number, found on a later dive by the team.
