= Pittsburgh Steamship Company =

The company used long flags on its ships that could be up to 4.5 meters long.

The Pittsburgh Steamship Company began operations in 1899 by Henry W. Oliver. In 1901 the company became a subsidiary of the United States Steel Corporation.

== Bibliography ==
- Miller, Al (1999). Tin Stackers. Wayne State University Press. ISBN 0-8143-2832-6.
