= Superior Shipbuilding Company =

Shipyard in Duluth, Minnesota, United States

Coordinates: 46.735868°N 92.090511°W

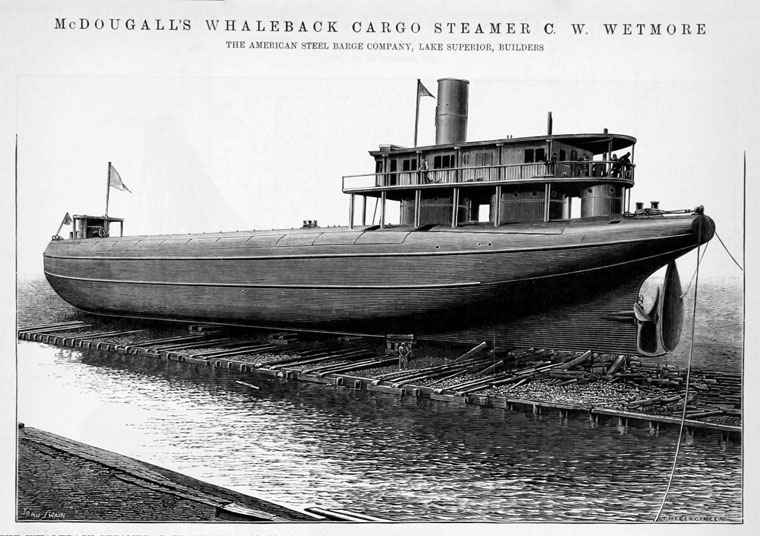
The whaleback steamer Charles W. Wetmore on the ways in Superior, Wisconsin

Map of Superior Port on western Lake Superior

The Superior Shipbuilding Company was originally called the American Steel Barge Company, and based in Duluth, Minnesota. It was founded by Scottish Captain Alexander McDougall who founded it so he could produce his new whaleback ship, this was Whaleback Barge 101. In 1900 McDougall sold his firm to the American Ship Building Company which transferred the company to Superior, Wisconsin and renamed it Superior Shipbuilding Company, also called AmShip Superior. After World War I the yard stopped manufacturing ships and instead turned to repair work. They continued repairing ships until 1945 when American Ship Building Company decided to sell it. It was initially known as the Knudsen Brothers Shipbuilding & Dry Dock Company. In 1955 it was renamed Fraser-Nelson Shipyards then Fraser Shipyards and still exists today. Fraser Shipyards does dry dock work, also conversions: steam to diesel and coal-fired to oil-burning. Lake Assault boat builders operate out of Fraser Shipyards.

== Ships built ==
=== American Steel Barge Company of Duluth, Minnesota ===
Ship	In service	Out of service	Length (ft)	Vessel type	Fate	Image
Whaleback Barge 101	1888	December 3, 1908	178	Whaleback barge	Foundered 30 miles off Seal Island in the Atlantic Ocean with the loss of seven lives.	
Whaleback Barge 102/Sir Joseph Wentworth	1889	December 15, 1905	253	Whaleback barge	Foundered south of Cape Charles with the loss of six lives.	
Whaleback Barge 103/John Scott Russell	1889	May 23, 1909	253	Whaleback barge	Foundered Sandy Hook. There were no deaths.	
Whaleback Barge 104	1890	November 11, 1898	276.50	Whaleback barge	Stranded near Cleveland, Ohio when the towline connecting her and the tug Alva B broke.	
Whaleback Barge 105/Baroness	1890	November 10, 1910	276.50	Whaleback barge	Foundered approximately ten miles southwest of Fire Island Light Vessel, New York. There were no deaths.	
Colgate Hoyt	1890	December 26, 1909	276.42	Whaleback steamer	Stranded off Seaside Park, New Jersey. There were no deaths.	

=== American Steel Barge Company of Superior, Wisconsin ===
Ship	In service	Out of service	Length (ft)	Vessel type	Fate	Image
Whaleback Barge 107/Bombay	1890	January 3, 1913	276.50	Whaleback barge	Foundered five miles northwest of the Handkerchief Light Vessel, near the Nantucket Shoals..	
Joseph L. Colby	1890	1935	265	Whaleback steamer	Scrapped in 1935, in Chicago, Illinois.	
Whaleback Barge 109/Baravia	1891	January 23, 1914	265	Whaleback barge	Sank off Montauk Point, Long Island Sound. There were no deaths.	
Whaleback Barge 110/Badger	1891	March 3, 1932	265	Whaleback barge	Blew up at one of the dock of the Cities Service Export Oil Company at St. Rose, Louisiana. One life was lost.	
Whaleback Barge 111/Ivie	1891	May 10, 1916	265	Whaleback barge	Rammed by the steamer Berkshire near Hampton Roads.	
Charles W. Wetmore	1891	September 8, 1892	265	Whaleback steamer	Stranded in Coos Bay, Oregon in heavy fog. She was declared a total loss and abandoned on September 13, 1892.	
E.B. Bartlett	1891	December 14, 1916	265	Whaleback steamer	Wrecked in Cape Cod with a cargo of coal bound for Boston.	
A.D. Thomson	1891	1936	265	Whaleback steamer	Scrapped in Chicago, Illinois, in 1936.	
S.O.Co. No. 55	1891	January 1917	125	Barge	Sank in Guantanamo Bay, Cuba.	

=== Superior Shipbuilding Company of Superior, Wisconsin ===
Ship	In service	Out of service	Length (ft)	Vessel type	Fate	Image
G.A. Flagg	1901	1927	332	Lake freighter	Scrapped in 1927.	
Randolph S. Warner	1901	1926	332	Lake freighter	Scrapped in 1926.	
Christopher	1901	1970	410	Lake freighter	Scrapped in 1970, in Hamilton, Ontario.	
Sultana	1902	1975	326	Lake freighter	Scrapped in 1975.	
G.J. Grammer	1902	1964	326	Lake freighter	Scrapped in 1964, in Humberstone, Ontario.	
Sonora	1902	1965	353.16	Lake freighter	Scrapped in 1965, in Ashtabula, Ohio.	
James H. Hoyt	1902	1968	363.16	Lake freighter	Scrapped in 1968, in Santander, Spain.	
John Sharples	1903	1914	255	Package freighter	Scrapped in 1947, on the East Coast.	
H.G. Dalton	1903	1970	255	Package freighter	Scrapped in 1970, in Hamilton, Ontario.	
D.G. Kerr	1903	1961	468	Lake freighter	Stranded off Ardrossan, Scotland in 1961; and later scrapped in Troon, Scotland.	
D.M. Clemson	1903	December 1, 1908	468	Lake freighter	Foundered on Lake Superior; all 24 crew members died. Location unknown.	
Henry S. Sill	1903	1947	416	Lake freighter	Scrapped in 1947, in Hamilton, Ontario.	
Wisconsin	1903	1946	428	Lake freighter	Scrapped in 1946, in Hamilton, Ontario.	
George W. Perkins	1905	1981	569	Lake freighter	Scrapped by Triad Salvage Company in 1981, in Ashtabula, Ohio.	
Abraham Stearn	1906	1974	545	Lake freighter	Scrapped in 1975, in Europe.	
E.J. Earling	1906	1969	555	Lake freighter	Scrapped in 1969, in Santander, Spain.	
Edward Y. Townsend	1906	October 7, 1968	603	Lake freighter	Broke away from the tug Hudson, and sank about 400 miles off the coast of Newfoundland.	
Sheldon Parks	1907	1964	552	Lake freighter	Scrapped in 1964, in Genoa, Italy.	
George F. Baker	1907	1979	601	Lake freighter	Scrapped in 1979, in Ashtabula, Ohio by the Triad Salvage Company.	
Ward Ames	1907	1980	550	Lake freighter	Scrapped in 1980, in Thunder Bay, Ontario by Western Metals Corporation.	
H.P. Bope	1907	1978	560	Lake freighter	Scrapped in 1978, in Santander, Spain.	
Rufus P. Ranney	1908	1961	440	Lake freighter	Scrapped in 1961, in La Spezia, Italy.	
J.F. Durston	1908	1961	452	Lake freighter	Scrapped in 1961, in Hamburg, Germany.	
Peter Reiss	1910	1973	524	Lake freighter	Scrapped in 1973, in Port Colborne, Ontario by the Dwor Metal Company.	
C.W. Cadwell	1911	1999	164	Dredger	Presumed scrapped in 1999.	
Robert J. Close	1913	1988	86.42	Crane barge	No longer registered in the United States between 1982 and 1988.	
Sir Trevor Dawson	1916	1970	600	Lake freighter	Arrived for scrapping in Santander, Spain on June 8, 1970.	

== See also ==
- Great Lakes Engineering Works
- Collingwood Shipbuilding Company
- Defoe Shipbuilding Company
- Manitowoc Shipbuilding Company
- American Ship Building Company
