= American Heritage of Invention & Technology =

Mainstream magazine of the history of technology

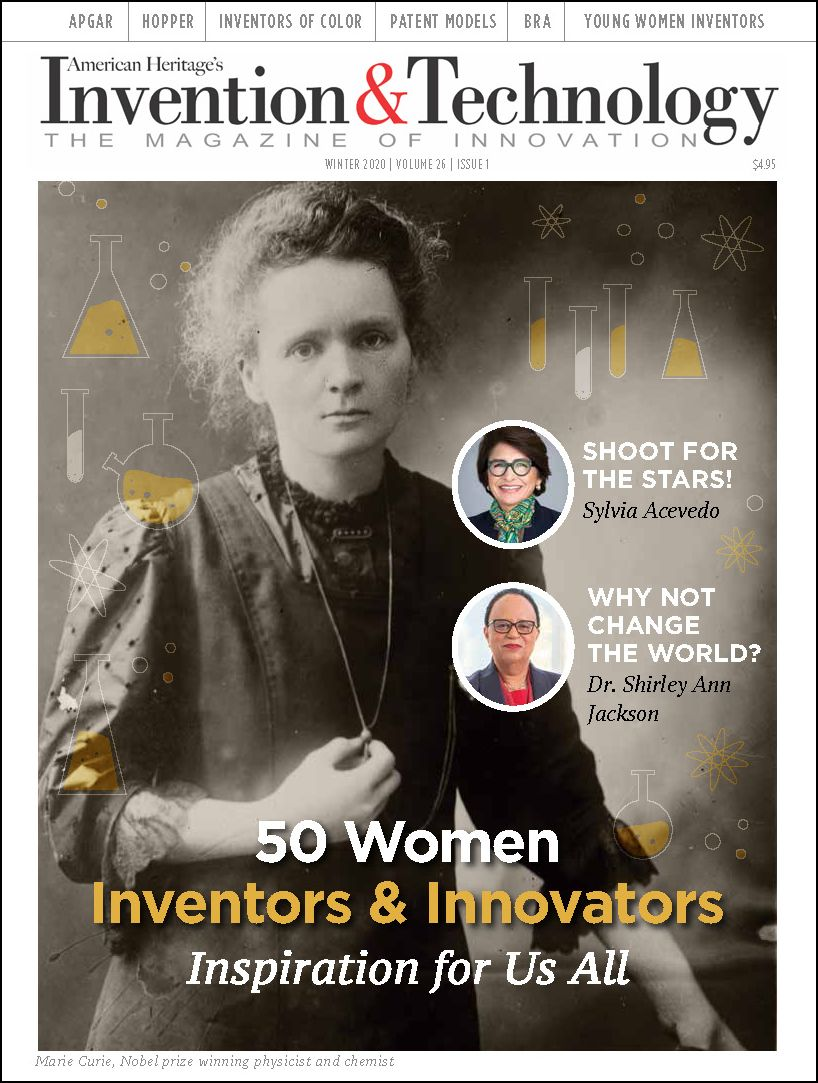
- The Spring 2020 issue profiled 50 women inventors.
- Editor: Edwin S. Grosvenor
- Former editors: Frederick Allen
- Frequency: Triannual (1985–1992); Quarterly (1992–2007; 2008–2011; 2020-present)
- Circulation: 32,000
- First issue: Summer 1985
- Company: American Heritage Publishing
- Country: United States
- Based in: Rockville, MD
- Language: English
- ISSN: 8756-7296
- OCLC: 11638224

Invention & Technology Magazine (formerly known as American Heritage of Invention & Technology) is a quarterly magazine dedicated to the history of technology. It was launched with sponsorship from General Motors in the summer of 1985 as a spinoff of American Heritage magazine. Later, the magazine had a partnership with the National Inventors Hall of Fame.

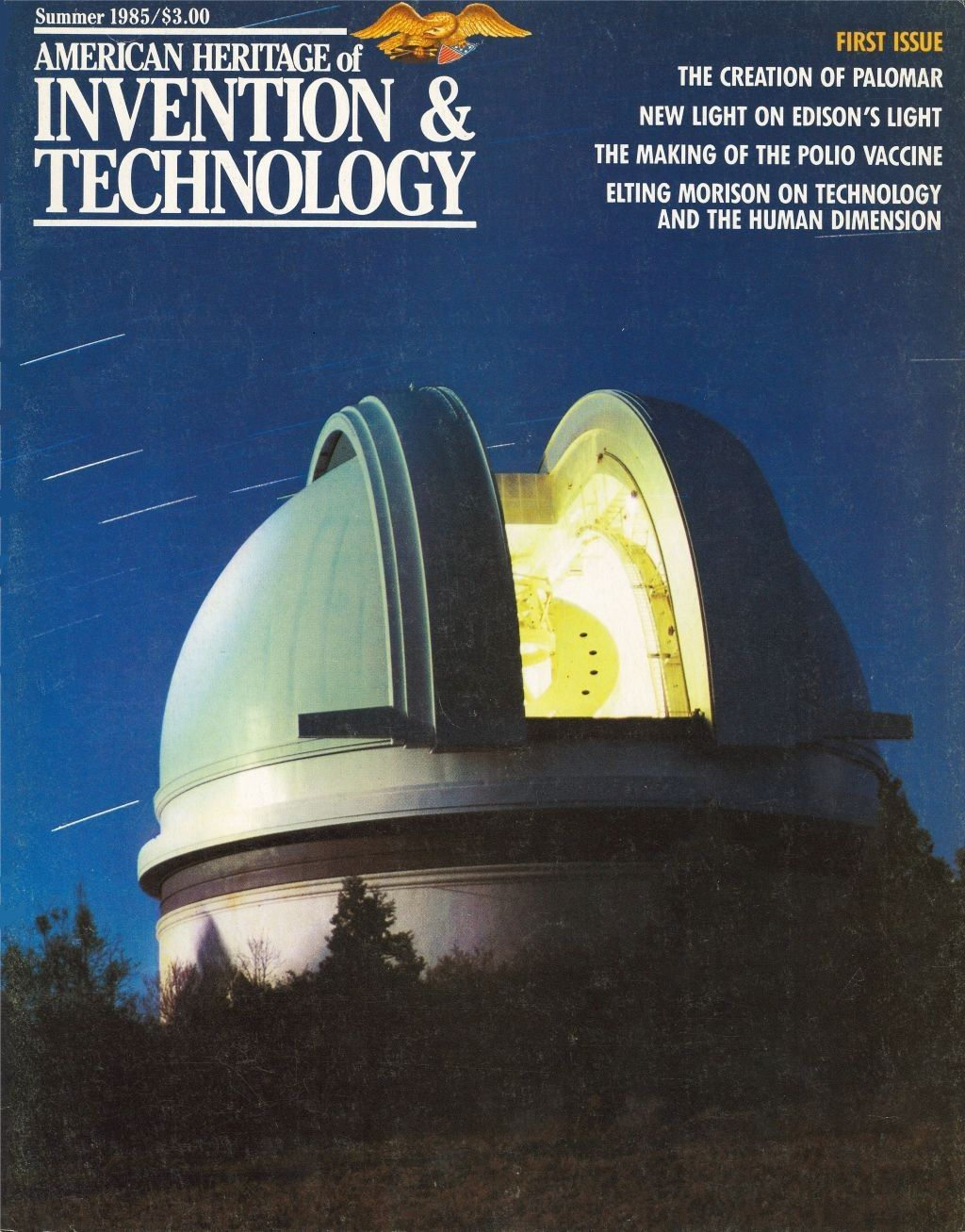
Invention & Technology launched with the Summer 1985 issue.

“Our subject matter is actually nothing less than the making of the world we live in, and the stories of all the extraordinary people who made it,” wrote Frederick Allen, the founding editor, in 1985. He noted that the field of the history of technology is relatively new. "Up to now there has been no general magazine of wide circulation reporting on it. A gap exists between the findings of the scholars and the educated public," he wrote.

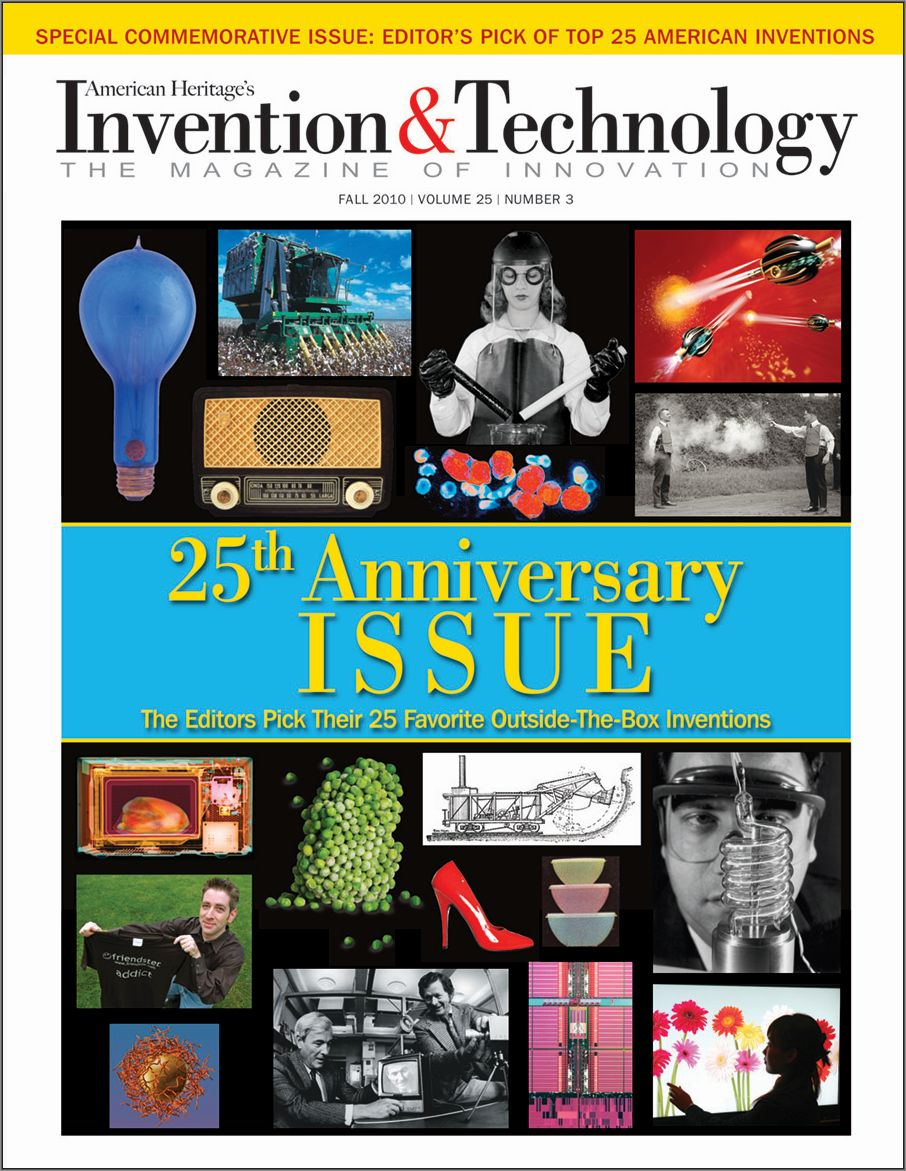
The Fall 2010 issue included a selection of articles from its 25 years.

There were three issues of the magazine a year until 1992, when it became quarterly. Following the Summer 2007 issue (volume 23, number 1), publication was suspended (along with American Heritage itself). Publication of the magazine resumed with the Summer 2008 issue (volume 23, number 2), under the slightly changed title American Heritage's Invention & Technology. Publication was suspended after the Winter 2011 issue (volume 25, number 4).

Invention & Technology relaunched in 2020 with grants from the Alfred P. Sloan Foundation and Charles Koch Institute and donations from 700 subscribers. Its first new issue included profiles of 50 women inventors with articles by Dr. Shirley Ann Jackson, President of Rensselaer Polytechnic Institute, Sylvia Acevedo, CEO of the Girl Scouts, and C. Daniel Mote Jr., former president of the University of Maryland.

Contributors have included such writers about the history of technology as W. Bernard Carlson, Tom D. Crouch, Julie M. Fenster, Robert Friedel, William S. Hammack, Stephen Hawking, T. A. Heppenheimer, Thomas P. Hughes, Sebastian Junger, Arthur Molella, Henry Petroski, Robert C. Post, and Mark Wolverton.

== See also ==
- The American Heritage Dictionary of the English Language
- American Heritage (magazine)
