= Alpena County George N. Fletcher Public Library =

Public library in Michigan, United States

- 45.06236°N 83.43108°W
- Location: Alpena, Michigan, United States
- Type: Public
- Established: 1967

Other information
- Website: www.alpenalibrary.org

The Alpena County George N. Fletcher Public Library is a public library in Alpena, Michigan, United States.

== History ==
Located in downtown Alpena, the Alpena County George N. Fletcher Public Library was established in 1967 as a county library. Prior to 1967, the public library was part of the Alpena Public School system and was housed in the high school. For the next seven years it occupied two storefronts on North Second Avenue.

In 1974, the library moved into the present facility at 211 North First Avenue. The 20,000-square-foot (1,900 m^{2}) building was built with monies raised from county, township, and Federal Revenue Sharing Funds plus a $100,000 grant from the Jesse Besser Fund.

In 1985 a library millage was passed by the voters, and a renewal was successful in 1995. An energy retrofit was done in 1986, and in 1997 the building received a complete makeover, which included an electrical upgrade. A new computer lab, with a direct connection to the Internet, was part of that project.
