= SS Charles W. Wetmore =

American whaleback freighter

Coordinates: 43°23′N 124°20′W

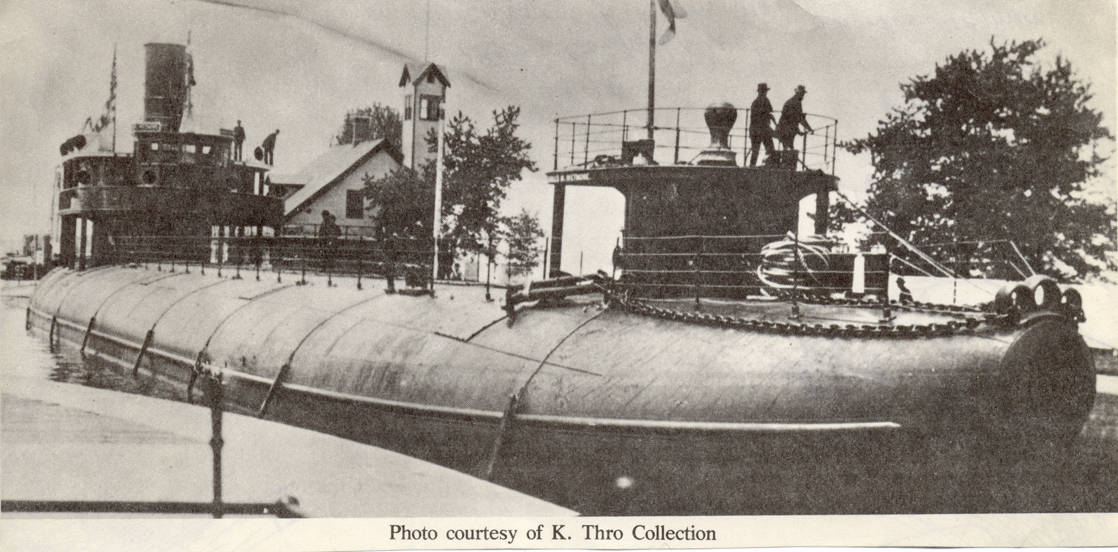
- The Wetmore, downbound through the Weitzel lock, at Sault Ste. Marie, Michigan, en route to London, 1891

History

United States
- Name: Charles W. Wetmore
- Owner: American Steel Barge Company
- Builder: American Steel Barge Company
- Yard number: 0112
- Laid down: 6 November 1890
- Launched: 23 May 1891
- In service: 1891
- Homeport: Superior, Wisconsin through May 1892, then Everett, Washington
- Fate: Wrecked 8 September 1892 off Coos Bay, Oregon

General characteristics
- Tonnage: 1,399 gross tons; 1,075 net tons
- Length: 264 ft (80 m)
- Beam: 38 ft (12 m)
- Draft: 16 ft (4.8768 m)
- Depth: 24 ft (7 m)
- Propulsion: 700 hp steam engine
- Capacity: 3,000 gross tons
- Crew: 22
- Notes: One of two whalebacks in ocean service; carried parts around Cape Horn to build the second one, City of Everett.

The SS Charles W. Wetmore was a whaleback freighter built in 1891 by Alexander McDougall's American Steel Barge Company shipyard in Superior, Wisconsin, USA. She was named in honor of Charles W. Wetmore, a business associate of Alexander McDougall, officer of the shipyard, and associate of the Rockefeller family.

== Construction and equipment ==
The Wetmore was built in 1891 as hull #112 of the American Steel Barge Company works. The Wetmore was 264 ft (80 m) long with a beam of 38 ft (12 m) and a 16.4 ft (5.0 m) draft and gross tonnage of 3,000. Her power was a single 700 horsepower (520 kW) steam engine, but she also had four jury masts with sails for emergency use. As typical for freight whalebacks, there was a small turret at the bow which had anchor hoisting machinery and other equipment. Three turrets at the stern raised the stern cabin and pilothouse off the hull. Her single stack exited through one of the turrets. A typical crew complement was 22.

== Operating history ==
The Wetmore was the first whaleback to operate outside the Great Lakes, when in June 1891, as a way to promote the whaleback design, she was sent to London and Liverpool, England, carrying a cargo of 95,000 bushels of grain. This required traversing the rapids of the Saint Lawrence River as she was too big to fit through the locks of the time, and was therefore practically a one-way journey. After her visit to England, where she reportedly caused a "sensation" she returned to New York and loaded machinery and equipment there and in Philadelphia. She then sailed to Everett, Washington, via Cape Horn. Her journey was covered in the Puget Sound local press. The equipment was to be used to start a new shipyard, The Pacific Steel Barge Company, and to outfit a nail mill and iron smelter.

Her designer, Alexander McDougall arrived in Everett in early December, in advance of her arrival. When almost there, she lost her rudder (it had gradually been coming unriveted since the Galápagos Islands according to her captain) and she had to be towed in by the SS Zambezi out of Hong Kong. As was typical marine salvage practice at the time, the owners of the Zambezi filed a salvage claim for one third the value of the ship and cargo. She was nevertheless received with great enthusiasm by the local townsfolk.

Her career was short: she ran aground on 8 September 1892 in fog off Coos Bay, Oregon while carrying a load of coal from Tacoma, Washington bound for San Francisco. Salvage attempts were frustrated due to bad weather, and the vessel was abandoned. Meanwhile the Pacific Steel Barge Company yard, founded with the equipment she brought, built the SS City of Everett. No other whalebacks were built by the shipyard.
