= Alexander McDougall (ship designer) =

Scottish-born American seaman (1845–1923)

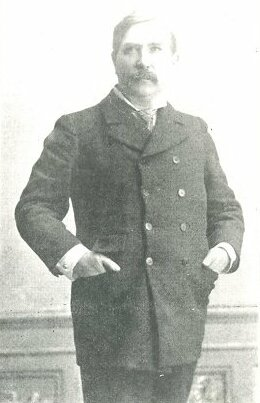
Alexander McDougall in 1919

Captain Alexander McDougall (March 15, 1845 – May 27, 1923) was a Scottish-born American seaman who built the whaleback style of cargo and excursion ship. In 1880, he designed a ship that he felt could withstand the worst lake water and carry the greatest cargo in the least depth of water. In 1917 he founded McDougall Duluth Shipbuilding Company to build World War I ships.

== Early life ==
McDougall was born on March 15, 1845, on the island of Islay, Scotland. He was the eldest son of parents Dugald and Ellen McDougall. In 1854, when McDougall was ten, he emigrated with his parents to the Canadian-Scots settlement of Nottawa, Ontario, now part of Collingwood. In 1862, at the age of seventeen, McDougall shipped out on the Great Lakes after limited schooling. He had time to pursue his hobby of designing ships of steel, and his experience with the violent storms of the Great Lakes prompted him to design the whaleback.

== Whaleback ==
McDougall built his first whaleback barge on his property in Duluth, on a site now occupied by Jeff Foster Trucking (formerly Superwood Corp). A whaleback was made of iron with an unusual design: when fully loaded, only the round portion of the hull could be seen above the waterline. It had a rounded neck so that water would not stand on board, and a spoon shaped prow to reduce water resistance. Because of its rounded hull, it was also easier to load and unload goods. McDougall conceived of a whaleback that could withstand the worst lake weather with maximal capacity of cargo. At first, he designed it to carry iron ore, but later it carried almost every commodity freighted by cargo ship.

Between 1890 and 1893 McDougall built fifteen whalebacks, in collaboration with John D. Rockefeller. Among them was the famous steamer Christopher Columbus, the only passenger carrier. The Meteor, the last whaleback in operation, was constructed as the Frank Rockefeller in 1896. In all, McDougall built 44 whalebacks. He died on May 27, 1923, at the age of 78.

== Drawbacks ==
The primary problem of the whaleback design was its hatches. The edges of the hatch openings and their covers would get bent, destroying the watertight seal. Collisions between unloading equipment and the hatch edges also often occurred, resulting in slow loading and unloading.

== General References ==
- Kucera, Barbara, U.S. Maritime Hall of fame to honor whaleback creator, Duluth News Tribune, May 5, 1982, 2
- Sanders, Carol, Shipping giant was a pioneer, Thunder Bay Chronicle Journal, March 10, 1993
- S.S Meteor Designer Hall of Fame Inductee, Superior Evening Telegram, April 12, 1982
- Wilterding, John, McDougall's Dream: The American Whaleback, Printed by Badger Bay printers, Green Bay Wisconsin Jr. Lakeside Publications Ltd, Copyright 1969,
